

240001–240100 

|-bgcolor=#fefefe
| 240001 ||  || — || September 26, 2001 || Palomar || NEAT || H || align=right | 1.0 km || 
|-id=002 bgcolor=#d6d6d6
| 240002 ||  || — || September 20, 2001 || Socorro || LINEAR || — || align=right | 2.8 km || 
|-id=003 bgcolor=#d6d6d6
| 240003 ||  || — || September 21, 2001 || Socorro || LINEAR || EOS || align=right | 2.9 km || 
|-id=004 bgcolor=#d6d6d6
| 240004 ||  || — || September 18, 2001 || Apache Point || SDSS || — || align=right | 4.0 km || 
|-id=005 bgcolor=#d6d6d6
| 240005 ||  || — || October 13, 2001 || Socorro || LINEAR || EUP || align=right | 5.7 km || 
|-id=006 bgcolor=#fefefe
| 240006 ||  || — || October 13, 2001 || Socorro || LINEAR || — || align=right data-sort-value="0.72" | 720 m || 
|-id=007 bgcolor=#d6d6d6
| 240007 ||  || — || October 14, 2001 || Cima Ekar || ADAS || — || align=right | 3.8 km || 
|-id=008 bgcolor=#d6d6d6
| 240008 ||  || — || October 13, 2001 || Socorro || LINEAR || — || align=right | 3.6 km || 
|-id=009 bgcolor=#fefefe
| 240009 ||  || — || October 13, 2001 || Socorro || LINEAR || — || align=right | 1.0 km || 
|-id=010 bgcolor=#d6d6d6
| 240010 ||  || — || October 10, 2001 || Palomar || NEAT || — || align=right | 3.5 km || 
|-id=011 bgcolor=#fefefe
| 240011 ||  || — || October 10, 2001 || Palomar || NEAT || — || align=right data-sort-value="0.98" | 980 m || 
|-id=012 bgcolor=#fefefe
| 240012 ||  || — || October 10, 2001 || Palomar || NEAT || FLO || align=right data-sort-value="0.95" | 950 m || 
|-id=013 bgcolor=#fefefe
| 240013 ||  || — || October 10, 2001 || Palomar || NEAT || — || align=right | 1.4 km || 
|-id=014 bgcolor=#d6d6d6
| 240014 ||  || — || October 15, 2001 || Palomar || NEAT || — || align=right | 4.5 km || 
|-id=015 bgcolor=#d6d6d6
| 240015 ||  || — || October 11, 2001 || Palomar || NEAT || — || align=right | 2.9 km || 
|-id=016 bgcolor=#d6d6d6
| 240016 ||  || — || October 11, 2001 || Palomar || NEAT || HYG || align=right | 4.2 km || 
|-id=017 bgcolor=#d6d6d6
| 240017 ||  || — || October 11, 2001 || Socorro || LINEAR || EOS || align=right | 2.9 km || 
|-id=018 bgcolor=#fefefe
| 240018 ||  || — || October 15, 2001 || Palomar || NEAT || FLO || align=right data-sort-value="0.81" | 810 m || 
|-id=019 bgcolor=#d6d6d6
| 240019 ||  || — || October 10, 2001 || Kitt Peak || Spacewatch || EOS || align=right | 2.8 km || 
|-id=020 bgcolor=#d6d6d6
| 240020 ||  || — || October 14, 2001 || Apache Point || SDSS || — || align=right | 3.9 km || 
|-id=021 bgcolor=#d6d6d6
| 240021 Radzo ||  ||  || October 8, 2001 || Palomar || NEAT || — || align=right | 6.8 km || 
|-id=022 bgcolor=#d6d6d6
| 240022 Demitra ||  ||  || October 15, 2001 || Palomar || NEAT || VER || align=right | 3.9 km || 
|-id=023 bgcolor=#fefefe
| 240023 ||  || — || October 16, 2001 || Palomar || NEAT || — || align=right data-sort-value="0.77" | 770 m || 
|-id=024 bgcolor=#d6d6d6
| 240024 ||  || — || October 17, 2001 || Socorro || LINEAR || — || align=right | 3.7 km || 
|-id=025 bgcolor=#d6d6d6
| 240025 ||  || — || October 17, 2001 || Socorro || LINEAR || TRP || align=right | 3.9 km || 
|-id=026 bgcolor=#d6d6d6
| 240026 ||  || — || October 17, 2001 || Socorro || LINEAR || — || align=right | 3.5 km || 
|-id=027 bgcolor=#fefefe
| 240027 ||  || — || October 17, 2001 || Socorro || LINEAR || — || align=right data-sort-value="0.89" | 890 m || 
|-id=028 bgcolor=#fefefe
| 240028 ||  || — || October 20, 2001 || Socorro || LINEAR || — || align=right data-sort-value="0.81" | 810 m || 
|-id=029 bgcolor=#fefefe
| 240029 ||  || — || October 17, 2001 || Kitt Peak || Spacewatch || FLO || align=right data-sort-value="0.81" | 810 m || 
|-id=030 bgcolor=#fefefe
| 240030 ||  || — || October 20, 2001 || Socorro || LINEAR || — || align=right | 1.0 km || 
|-id=031 bgcolor=#d6d6d6
| 240031 ||  || — || October 19, 2001 || Palomar || NEAT || HYG || align=right | 3.5 km || 
|-id=032 bgcolor=#d6d6d6
| 240032 ||  || — || October 17, 2001 || Socorro || LINEAR || HYG || align=right | 3.9 km || 
|-id=033 bgcolor=#fefefe
| 240033 ||  || — || October 17, 2001 || Socorro || LINEAR || FLO || align=right data-sort-value="0.81" | 810 m || 
|-id=034 bgcolor=#fefefe
| 240034 ||  || — || October 20, 2001 || Socorro || LINEAR || FLO || align=right | 1.00 km || 
|-id=035 bgcolor=#d6d6d6
| 240035 ||  || — || October 21, 2001 || Socorro || LINEAR || ALA || align=right | 5.6 km || 
|-id=036 bgcolor=#fefefe
| 240036 ||  || — || October 22, 2001 || Socorro || LINEAR || — || align=right | 1.2 km || 
|-id=037 bgcolor=#fefefe
| 240037 ||  || — || October 22, 2001 || Socorro || LINEAR || NYS || align=right data-sort-value="0.83" | 830 m || 
|-id=038 bgcolor=#fefefe
| 240038 ||  || — || October 22, 2001 || Socorro || LINEAR || FLO || align=right data-sort-value="0.87" | 870 m || 
|-id=039 bgcolor=#d6d6d6
| 240039 ||  || — || October 22, 2001 || Socorro || LINEAR || — || align=right | 7.3 km || 
|-id=040 bgcolor=#d6d6d6
| 240040 ||  || — || October 20, 2001 || Socorro || LINEAR || — || align=right | 3.9 km || 
|-id=041 bgcolor=#fefefe
| 240041 ||  || — || October 21, 2001 || Socorro || LINEAR || V || align=right data-sort-value="0.93" | 930 m || 
|-id=042 bgcolor=#fefefe
| 240042 ||  || — || October 18, 2001 || Palomar || NEAT || NYS || align=right data-sort-value="0.73" | 730 m || 
|-id=043 bgcolor=#fefefe
| 240043 ||  || — || October 18, 2001 || Palomar || NEAT || — || align=right | 1.2 km || 
|-id=044 bgcolor=#fefefe
| 240044 ||  || — || October 23, 2001 || Socorro || LINEAR || — || align=right | 1.6 km || 
|-id=045 bgcolor=#d6d6d6
| 240045 ||  || — || October 18, 2001 || Palomar || NEAT || URS || align=right | 3.5 km || 
|-id=046 bgcolor=#d6d6d6
| 240046 ||  || — || November 9, 2001 || Socorro || LINEAR || — || align=right | 4.0 km || 
|-id=047 bgcolor=#fefefe
| 240047 ||  || — || November 12, 2001 || Socorro || LINEAR || V || align=right data-sort-value="0.80" | 800 m || 
|-id=048 bgcolor=#d6d6d6
| 240048 ||  || — || November 16, 2001 || Kitt Peak || Spacewatch || EOS || align=right | 3.2 km || 
|-id=049 bgcolor=#d6d6d6
| 240049 ||  || — || November 17, 2001 || Socorro || LINEAR || — || align=right | 4.8 km || 
|-id=050 bgcolor=#d6d6d6
| 240050 ||  || — || November 16, 2001 || Kitt Peak || Spacewatch || — || align=right | 3.5 km || 
|-id=051 bgcolor=#fefefe
| 240051 ||  || — || November 17, 2001 || Socorro || LINEAR || — || align=right | 1.2 km || 
|-id=052 bgcolor=#d6d6d6
| 240052 ||  || — || November 17, 2001 || Socorro || LINEAR || — || align=right | 5.4 km || 
|-id=053 bgcolor=#d6d6d6
| 240053 ||  || — || November 17, 2001 || Socorro || LINEAR || — || align=right | 4.8 km || 
|-id=054 bgcolor=#fefefe
| 240054 ||  || — || November 17, 2001 || Socorro || LINEAR || — || align=right | 2.5 km || 
|-id=055 bgcolor=#d6d6d6
| 240055 ||  || — || November 17, 2001 || Socorro || LINEAR || EUP || align=right | 5.4 km || 
|-id=056 bgcolor=#fefefe
| 240056 ||  || — || November 17, 2001 || Socorro || LINEAR || — || align=right | 2.4 km || 
|-id=057 bgcolor=#d6d6d6
| 240057 ||  || — || November 20, 2001 || Socorro || LINEAR || — || align=right | 5.4 km || 
|-id=058 bgcolor=#d6d6d6
| 240058 ||  || — || November 20, 2001 || Socorro || LINEAR || — || align=right | 3.6 km || 
|-id=059 bgcolor=#d6d6d6
| 240059 ||  || — || December 9, 2001 || Socorro || LINEAR || — || align=right | 3.7 km || 
|-id=060 bgcolor=#fefefe
| 240060 ||  || — || December 10, 2001 || Socorro || LINEAR || — || align=right | 1.1 km || 
|-id=061 bgcolor=#d6d6d6
| 240061 ||  || — || December 11, 2001 || Socorro || LINEAR || VER || align=right | 5.2 km || 
|-id=062 bgcolor=#fefefe
| 240062 ||  || — || December 10, 2001 || Socorro || LINEAR || NYS || align=right data-sort-value="0.91" | 910 m || 
|-id=063 bgcolor=#d6d6d6
| 240063 ||  || — || December 10, 2001 || Socorro || LINEAR || — || align=right | 4.3 km || 
|-id=064 bgcolor=#d6d6d6
| 240064 ||  || — || December 14, 2001 || Socorro || LINEAR || HYG || align=right | 3.9 km || 
|-id=065 bgcolor=#fefefe
| 240065 ||  || — || December 14, 2001 || Socorro || LINEAR || NYS || align=right data-sort-value="0.76" | 760 m || 
|-id=066 bgcolor=#d6d6d6
| 240066 ||  || — || December 14, 2001 || Socorro || LINEAR || — || align=right | 6.4 km || 
|-id=067 bgcolor=#d6d6d6
| 240067 ||  || — || December 15, 2001 || Socorro || LINEAR || URS || align=right | 5.4 km || 
|-id=068 bgcolor=#d6d6d6
| 240068 ||  || — || December 14, 2001 || Socorro || LINEAR || — || align=right | 4.6 km || 
|-id=069 bgcolor=#fefefe
| 240069 ||  || — || December 17, 2001 || Socorro || LINEAR || — || align=right | 1.2 km || 
|-id=070 bgcolor=#fefefe
| 240070 ||  || — || December 18, 2001 || Socorro || LINEAR || — || align=right | 1.7 km || 
|-id=071 bgcolor=#d6d6d6
| 240071 ||  || — || December 17, 2001 || Socorro || LINEAR || — || align=right | 6.7 km || 
|-id=072 bgcolor=#fefefe
| 240072 ||  || — || December 18, 2001 || Socorro || LINEAR || H || align=right data-sort-value="0.92" | 920 m || 
|-id=073 bgcolor=#fefefe
| 240073 ||  || — || December 16, 2001 || Palomar || NEAT || V || align=right | 1.0 km || 
|-id=074 bgcolor=#fefefe
| 240074 ||  || — || January 9, 2002 || Socorro || LINEAR || — || align=right data-sort-value="0.98" | 980 m || 
|-id=075 bgcolor=#fefefe
| 240075 ||  || — || January 9, 2002 || Socorro || LINEAR || — || align=right | 1.3 km || 
|-id=076 bgcolor=#fefefe
| 240076 ||  || — || January 9, 2002 || Socorro || LINEAR || NYS || align=right data-sort-value="0.84" | 840 m || 
|-id=077 bgcolor=#fefefe
| 240077 ||  || — || January 8, 2002 || Socorro || LINEAR || — || align=right | 1.3 km || 
|-id=078 bgcolor=#fefefe
| 240078 ||  || — || January 8, 2002 || Socorro || LINEAR || NYS || align=right data-sort-value="0.74" | 740 m || 
|-id=079 bgcolor=#fefefe
| 240079 ||  || — || January 12, 2002 || Socorro || LINEAR || — || align=right data-sort-value="0.91" | 910 m || 
|-id=080 bgcolor=#fefefe
| 240080 ||  || — || January 9, 2002 || Socorro || LINEAR || ERI || align=right | 2.5 km || 
|-id=081 bgcolor=#fefefe
| 240081 ||  || — || January 13, 2002 || Socorro || LINEAR || — || align=right | 1.0 km || 
|-id=082 bgcolor=#fefefe
| 240082 ||  || — || January 14, 2002 || Socorro || LINEAR || — || align=right | 1.1 km || 
|-id=083 bgcolor=#fefefe
| 240083 ||  || — || January 14, 2002 || Socorro || LINEAR || — || align=right | 1.6 km || 
|-id=084 bgcolor=#fefefe
| 240084 ||  || — || January 8, 2002 || Socorro || LINEAR || FLO || align=right data-sort-value="0.92" | 920 m || 
|-id=085 bgcolor=#d6d6d6
| 240085 ||  || — || January 11, 2002 || Kitt Peak || Spacewatch || — || align=right | 5.7 km || 
|-id=086 bgcolor=#d6d6d6
| 240086 ||  || — || January 9, 2002 || Socorro || LINEAR || EUP || align=right | 6.5 km || 
|-id=087 bgcolor=#fefefe
| 240087 ||  || — || January 12, 2002 || Palomar || NEAT || NYS || align=right data-sort-value="0.83" | 830 m || 
|-id=088 bgcolor=#d6d6d6
| 240088 ||  || — || January 13, 2002 || Apache Point || SDSS || — || align=right | 3.9 km || 
|-id=089 bgcolor=#fefefe
| 240089 ||  || — || January 25, 2002 || Socorro || LINEAR || H || align=right data-sort-value="0.80" | 800 m || 
|-id=090 bgcolor=#fefefe
| 240090 ||  || — || January 20, 2002 || Anderson Mesa || LONEOS || V || align=right | 1.1 km || 
|-id=091 bgcolor=#fefefe
| 240091 ||  || — || February 4, 2002 || Palomar || NEAT || V || align=right | 1.1 km || 
|-id=092 bgcolor=#fefefe
| 240092 ||  || — || February 6, 2002 || Socorro || LINEAR || V || align=right | 1.1 km || 
|-id=093 bgcolor=#d6d6d6
| 240093 ||  || — || February 12, 2002 || Desert Eagle || W. K. Y. Yeung || EUP || align=right | 9.8 km || 
|-id=094 bgcolor=#fefefe
| 240094 ||  || — || February 7, 2002 || Socorro || LINEAR || NYS || align=right data-sort-value="0.92" | 920 m || 
|-id=095 bgcolor=#fefefe
| 240095 ||  || — || February 7, 2002 || Socorro || LINEAR || MAS || align=right | 1.2 km || 
|-id=096 bgcolor=#fefefe
| 240096 ||  || — || February 7, 2002 || Socorro || LINEAR || — || align=right | 1.5 km || 
|-id=097 bgcolor=#fefefe
| 240097 ||  || — || February 7, 2002 || Socorro || LINEAR || — || align=right data-sort-value="0.83" | 830 m || 
|-id=098 bgcolor=#fefefe
| 240098 ||  || — || February 7, 2002 || Socorro || LINEAR || NYS || align=right | 1.1 km || 
|-id=099 bgcolor=#fefefe
| 240099 ||  || — || February 7, 2002 || Socorro || LINEAR || — || align=right data-sort-value="0.97" | 970 m || 
|-id=100 bgcolor=#d6d6d6
| 240100 ||  || — || February 7, 2002 || Socorro || LINEAR || EOS || align=right | 5.1 km || 
|}

240101–240200 

|-bgcolor=#fefefe
| 240101 ||  || — || February 8, 2002 || Socorro || LINEAR || — || align=right | 1.2 km || 
|-id=102 bgcolor=#fefefe
| 240102 ||  || — || February 8, 2002 || Socorro || LINEAR || — || align=right | 1.4 km || 
|-id=103 bgcolor=#fefefe
| 240103 ||  || — || February 10, 2002 || Socorro || LINEAR || NYS || align=right data-sort-value="0.78" | 780 m || 
|-id=104 bgcolor=#fefefe
| 240104 ||  || — || February 10, 2002 || Socorro || LINEAR || V || align=right | 1.0 km || 
|-id=105 bgcolor=#fefefe
| 240105 ||  || — || February 10, 2002 || Socorro || LINEAR || MAS || align=right data-sort-value="0.76" | 760 m || 
|-id=106 bgcolor=#fefefe
| 240106 ||  || — || February 10, 2002 || Socorro || LINEAR || MAS || align=right data-sort-value="0.96" | 960 m || 
|-id=107 bgcolor=#fefefe
| 240107 ||  || — || February 10, 2002 || Socorro || LINEAR || — || align=right | 1.5 km || 
|-id=108 bgcolor=#fefefe
| 240108 ||  || — || February 14, 2002 || Bergisch Gladbach || W. Bickel || MAS || align=right data-sort-value="0.77" | 770 m || 
|-id=109 bgcolor=#E9E9E9
| 240109 ||  || — || February 11, 2002 || Socorro || LINEAR || EUN || align=right | 1.9 km || 
|-id=110 bgcolor=#fefefe
| 240110 ||  || — || February 4, 2002 || Haleakala || NEAT || — || align=right | 1.0 km || 
|-id=111 bgcolor=#fefefe
| 240111 ||  || — || February 7, 2002 || Palomar || NEAT || NYS || align=right data-sort-value="0.92" | 920 m || 
|-id=112 bgcolor=#fefefe
| 240112 ||  || — || February 6, 2002 || Palomar || NEAT || V || align=right data-sort-value="0.94" | 940 m || 
|-id=113 bgcolor=#fefefe
| 240113 ||  || — || February 10, 2002 || Socorro || LINEAR || — || align=right | 1.1 km || 
|-id=114 bgcolor=#fefefe
| 240114 ||  || — || March 3, 2002 || Socorro || LINEAR || H || align=right | 1.1 km || 
|-id=115 bgcolor=#fefefe
| 240115 ||  || — || March 10, 2002 || Kitt Peak || Spacewatch || NYS || align=right data-sort-value="0.72" | 720 m || 
|-id=116 bgcolor=#fefefe
| 240116 ||  || — || March 9, 2002 || Socorro || LINEAR || MAS || align=right | 1.1 km || 
|-id=117 bgcolor=#fefefe
| 240117 ||  || — || March 13, 2002 || Socorro || LINEAR || NYS || align=right data-sort-value="0.85" | 850 m || 
|-id=118 bgcolor=#fefefe
| 240118 ||  || — || March 12, 2002 || Socorro || LINEAR || ERI || align=right | 2.8 km || 
|-id=119 bgcolor=#fefefe
| 240119 ||  || — || March 13, 2002 || Socorro || LINEAR || NYS || align=right | 1.1 km || 
|-id=120 bgcolor=#FA8072
| 240120 ||  || — || March 12, 2002 || Palomar || NEAT || H || align=right data-sort-value="0.96" | 960 m || 
|-id=121 bgcolor=#fefefe
| 240121 ||  || — || March 9, 2002 || Socorro || LINEAR || — || align=right | 2.0 km || 
|-id=122 bgcolor=#fefefe
| 240122 ||  || — || March 11, 2002 || Cima Ekar || ADAS || — || align=right | 1.2 km || 
|-id=123 bgcolor=#E9E9E9
| 240123 ||  || — || March 18, 2002 || Kitt Peak || Spacewatch || — || align=right | 2.2 km || 
|-id=124 bgcolor=#fefefe
| 240124 ||  || — || April 11, 2002 || Socorro || LINEAR || H || align=right data-sort-value="0.98" | 980 m || 
|-id=125 bgcolor=#E9E9E9
| 240125 ||  || — || April 13, 2002 || Palomar || NEAT || HNS || align=right | 1.8 km || 
|-id=126 bgcolor=#E9E9E9
| 240126 ||  || — || April 2, 2002 || Palomar || NEAT || — || align=right | 1.7 km || 
|-id=127 bgcolor=#E9E9E9
| 240127 ||  || — || April 12, 2002 || Palomar || NEAT || — || align=right | 3.4 km || 
|-id=128 bgcolor=#E9E9E9
| 240128 ||  || — || April 13, 2002 || Palomar || NEAT || — || align=right | 1.0 km || 
|-id=129 bgcolor=#E9E9E9
| 240129 ||  || — || April 13, 2002 || Palomar || NEAT || — || align=right | 4.3 km || 
|-id=130 bgcolor=#fefefe
| 240130 ||  || — || April 12, 2002 || Palomar || NEAT || H || align=right | 1.0 km || 
|-id=131 bgcolor=#E9E9E9
| 240131 ||  || — || April 14, 2002 || Palomar || NEAT || — || align=right | 1.6 km || 
|-id=132 bgcolor=#fefefe
| 240132 || 2002 JD || — || May 3, 2002 || Eskridge || Farpoint Obs. || H || align=right data-sort-value="0.97" | 970 m || 
|-id=133 bgcolor=#fefefe
| 240133 ||  || — || May 6, 2002 || Socorro || LINEAR || H || align=right data-sort-value="0.85" | 850 m || 
|-id=134 bgcolor=#d6d6d6
| 240134 ||  || — || May 9, 2002 || Socorro || LINEAR || 3:2 || align=right | 6.8 km || 
|-id=135 bgcolor=#E9E9E9
| 240135 ||  || — || May 9, 2002 || Socorro || LINEAR || — || align=right | 1.8 km || 
|-id=136 bgcolor=#E9E9E9
| 240136 ||  || — || May 9, 2002 || Socorro || LINEAR || — || align=right | 1.8 km || 
|-id=137 bgcolor=#E9E9E9
| 240137 ||  || — || May 9, 2002 || Socorro || LINEAR || — || align=right | 3.3 km || 
|-id=138 bgcolor=#E9E9E9
| 240138 ||  || — || May 9, 2002 || Socorro || LINEAR || — || align=right | 3.4 km || 
|-id=139 bgcolor=#E9E9E9
| 240139 ||  || — || May 9, 2002 || Socorro || LINEAR || — || align=right | 1.3 km || 
|-id=140 bgcolor=#E9E9E9
| 240140 ||  || — || May 9, 2002 || Socorro || LINEAR || — || align=right | 1.8 km || 
|-id=141 bgcolor=#E9E9E9
| 240141 ||  || — || May 10, 2002 || Socorro || LINEAR || — || align=right | 3.3 km || 
|-id=142 bgcolor=#E9E9E9
| 240142 ||  || — || May 12, 2002 || Socorro || LINEAR || — || align=right | 1.9 km || 
|-id=143 bgcolor=#E9E9E9
| 240143 ||  || — || May 11, 2002 || Socorro || LINEAR || — || align=right | 1.6 km || 
|-id=144 bgcolor=#E9E9E9
| 240144 ||  || — || May 15, 2002 || Haleakala || NEAT || — || align=right | 1.7 km || 
|-id=145 bgcolor=#fefefe
| 240145 ||  || — || May 6, 2002 || Socorro || LINEAR || H || align=right | 1.1 km || 
|-id=146 bgcolor=#fefefe
| 240146 ||  || — || May 5, 2002 || Socorro || LINEAR || H || align=right data-sort-value="0.95" | 950 m || 
|-id=147 bgcolor=#E9E9E9
| 240147 ||  || — || May 9, 2002 || Palomar || NEAT || RAF || align=right | 1.1 km || 
|-id=148 bgcolor=#fefefe
| 240148 ||  || — || May 13, 2002 || Palomar || NEAT || H || align=right data-sort-value="0.85" | 850 m || 
|-id=149 bgcolor=#E9E9E9
| 240149 ||  || — || May 15, 2002 || Haleakala || NEAT || — || align=right | 1.3 km || 
|-id=150 bgcolor=#E9E9E9
| 240150 ||  || — || June 5, 2002 || Socorro || LINEAR || EUN || align=right | 2.5 km || 
|-id=151 bgcolor=#E9E9E9
| 240151 ||  || — || June 10, 2002 || Socorro || LINEAR || — || align=right | 4.2 km || 
|-id=152 bgcolor=#E9E9E9
| 240152 ||  || — || July 13, 2002 || Reedy Creek || J. Broughton || BRG || align=right | 2.7 km || 
|-id=153 bgcolor=#E9E9E9
| 240153 ||  || — || July 9, 2002 || Socorro || LINEAR || — || align=right | 2.5 km || 
|-id=154 bgcolor=#E9E9E9
| 240154 ||  || — || July 9, 2002 || Socorro || LINEAR || RAF || align=right | 1.4 km || 
|-id=155 bgcolor=#E9E9E9
| 240155 ||  || — || July 13, 2002 || Haleakala || NEAT || — || align=right | 1.6 km || 
|-id=156 bgcolor=#E9E9E9
| 240156 ||  || — || July 5, 2002 || Palomar || NEAT || — || align=right | 2.0 km || 
|-id=157 bgcolor=#E9E9E9
| 240157 ||  || — || July 9, 2002 || Palomar || NEAT || — || align=right | 2.6 km || 
|-id=158 bgcolor=#d6d6d6
| 240158 ||  || — || July 18, 2002 || Palomar || NEAT || CHA || align=right | 3.5 km || 
|-id=159 bgcolor=#E9E9E9
| 240159 ||  || — || July 29, 2002 || Palomar || NEAT || — || align=right | 2.2 km || 
|-id=160 bgcolor=#E9E9E9
| 240160 ||  || — || August 5, 2002 || Palomar || NEAT || — || align=right | 2.5 km || 
|-id=161 bgcolor=#E9E9E9
| 240161 ||  || — || August 6, 2002 || Palomar || NEAT || DOR || align=right | 3.6 km || 
|-id=162 bgcolor=#E9E9E9
| 240162 ||  || — || August 6, 2002 || Palomar || NEAT || EUN || align=right | 1.4 km || 
|-id=163 bgcolor=#E9E9E9
| 240163 ||  || — || August 5, 2002 || Campo Imperatore || CINEOS || NEM || align=right | 3.0 km || 
|-id=164 bgcolor=#E9E9E9
| 240164 ||  || — || August 14, 2002 || Socorro || LINEAR || MAR || align=right | 3.8 km || 
|-id=165 bgcolor=#E9E9E9
| 240165 ||  || — || August 12, 2002 || Socorro || LINEAR || EUN || align=right | 1.8 km || 
|-id=166 bgcolor=#E9E9E9
| 240166 ||  || — || August 13, 2002 || Anderson Mesa || LONEOS || — || align=right | 3.4 km || 
|-id=167 bgcolor=#E9E9E9
| 240167 ||  || — || August 9, 2002 || Haleakala || NEAT || — || align=right | 4.7 km || 
|-id=168 bgcolor=#E9E9E9
| 240168 ||  || — || August 13, 2002 || Anderson Mesa || LONEOS || VIB || align=right | 1.9 km || 
|-id=169 bgcolor=#E9E9E9
| 240169 ||  || — || August 14, 2002 || Socorro || LINEAR || MIS || align=right | 3.3 km || 
|-id=170 bgcolor=#E9E9E9
| 240170 ||  || — || August 15, 2002 || Palomar || NEAT || — || align=right | 3.9 km || 
|-id=171 bgcolor=#E9E9E9
| 240171 ||  || — || August 8, 2002 || Palomar || NEAT || PAD || align=right | 1.7 km || 
|-id=172 bgcolor=#d6d6d6
| 240172 ||  || — || August 8, 2002 || Palomar || NEAT || — || align=right | 3.6 km || 
|-id=173 bgcolor=#E9E9E9
| 240173 ||  || — || August 15, 2002 || Palomar || NEAT || — || align=right | 2.0 km || 
|-id=174 bgcolor=#E9E9E9
| 240174 ||  || — || August 8, 2002 || Palomar || NEAT || — || align=right | 1.7 km || 
|-id=175 bgcolor=#E9E9E9
| 240175 ||  || — || August 14, 2002 || Palomar || NEAT || — || align=right | 2.5 km || 
|-id=176 bgcolor=#E9E9E9
| 240176 ||  || — || August 26, 2002 || Palomar || NEAT || — || align=right | 1.9 km || 
|-id=177 bgcolor=#E9E9E9
| 240177 ||  || — || August 28, 2002 || Palomar || NEAT || WIT || align=right | 1.5 km || 
|-id=178 bgcolor=#E9E9E9
| 240178 ||  || — || August 29, 2002 || Palomar || NEAT || AGN || align=right | 1.8 km || 
|-id=179 bgcolor=#E9E9E9
| 240179 ||  || — || August 30, 2002 || Palomar || NEAT || — || align=right | 1.9 km || 
|-id=180 bgcolor=#E9E9E9
| 240180 ||  || — || August 27, 2002 || Palomar || NEAT || RAF || align=right | 1.5 km || 
|-id=181 bgcolor=#E9E9E9
| 240181 ||  || — || August 29, 2002 || Palomar || S. F. Hönig || — || align=right | 2.3 km || 
|-id=182 bgcolor=#E9E9E9
| 240182 ||  || — || August 19, 2002 || Palomar || NEAT || — || align=right | 2.7 km || 
|-id=183 bgcolor=#E9E9E9
| 240183 ||  || — || August 19, 2002 || Palomar || NEAT || NEM || align=right | 2.4 km || 
|-id=184 bgcolor=#d6d6d6
| 240184 ||  || — || August 16, 2002 || Palomar || NEAT || — || align=right | 5.6 km || 
|-id=185 bgcolor=#E9E9E9
| 240185 ||  || — || August 26, 2002 || Palomar || NEAT || — || align=right | 2.0 km || 
|-id=186 bgcolor=#E9E9E9
| 240186 ||  || — || August 19, 2002 || Palomar || NEAT || WIT || align=right | 1.5 km || 
|-id=187 bgcolor=#d6d6d6
| 240187 ||  || — || August 20, 2002 || Palomar || NEAT || KOR || align=right | 1.8 km || 
|-id=188 bgcolor=#E9E9E9
| 240188 ||  || — || August 19, 2002 || Palomar || NEAT || — || align=right | 2.2 km || 
|-id=189 bgcolor=#E9E9E9
| 240189 ||  || — || August 18, 2002 || Palomar || NEAT || HOF || align=right | 3.3 km || 
|-id=190 bgcolor=#E9E9E9
| 240190 ||  || — || August 26, 2002 || Palomar || NEAT || — || align=right | 2.9 km || 
|-id=191 bgcolor=#E9E9E9
| 240191 ||  || — || August 27, 2002 || Palomar || NEAT || — || align=right | 5.4 km || 
|-id=192 bgcolor=#E9E9E9
| 240192 ||  || — || August 27, 2002 || Palomar || NEAT || AGN || align=right | 1.4 km || 
|-id=193 bgcolor=#E9E9E9
| 240193 ||  || — || August 30, 2002 || Palomar || NEAT || — || align=right | 2.4 km || 
|-id=194 bgcolor=#E9E9E9
| 240194 ||  || — || September 4, 2002 || Anderson Mesa || LONEOS || — || align=right | 3.1 km || 
|-id=195 bgcolor=#E9E9E9
| 240195 ||  || — || September 4, 2002 || Anderson Mesa || LONEOS || XIZ || align=right | 2.2 km || 
|-id=196 bgcolor=#d6d6d6
| 240196 ||  || — || September 4, 2002 || Anderson Mesa || LONEOS || EOS || align=right | 2.5 km || 
|-id=197 bgcolor=#E9E9E9
| 240197 ||  || — || September 5, 2002 || Anderson Mesa || LONEOS || — || align=right | 2.8 km || 
|-id=198 bgcolor=#E9E9E9
| 240198 ||  || — || September 5, 2002 || Socorro || LINEAR || — || align=right | 2.9 km || 
|-id=199 bgcolor=#E9E9E9
| 240199 ||  || — || September 5, 2002 || Socorro || LINEAR || GEF || align=right | 2.5 km || 
|-id=200 bgcolor=#E9E9E9
| 240200 ||  || — || September 5, 2002 || Socorro || LINEAR || — || align=right | 2.5 km || 
|}

240201–240300 

|-bgcolor=#E9E9E9
| 240201 ||  || — || September 9, 2002 || Palomar || NEAT || — || align=right | 2.5 km || 
|-id=202 bgcolor=#E9E9E9
| 240202 ||  || — || September 9, 2002 || Haleakala || NEAT || — || align=right | 4.5 km || 
|-id=203 bgcolor=#E9E9E9
| 240203 ||  || — || September 11, 2002 || Palomar || NEAT || — || align=right | 3.5 km || 
|-id=204 bgcolor=#E9E9E9
| 240204 ||  || — || September 11, 2002 || Palomar || NEAT || — || align=right | 2.9 km || 
|-id=205 bgcolor=#E9E9E9
| 240205 ||  || — || September 12, 2002 || Palomar || NEAT || — || align=right | 3.8 km || 
|-id=206 bgcolor=#E9E9E9
| 240206 ||  || — || September 14, 2002 || Haleakala || NEAT || — || align=right | 3.7 km || 
|-id=207 bgcolor=#E9E9E9
| 240207 ||  || — || September 14, 2002 || Palomar || NEAT || WIT || align=right | 1.5 km || 
|-id=208 bgcolor=#E9E9E9
| 240208 ||  || — || September 12, 2002 || Palomar || R. Matson || PAE || align=right | 3.1 km || 
|-id=209 bgcolor=#E9E9E9
| 240209 ||  || — || September 4, 2002 || Palomar || NEAT || — || align=right | 3.9 km || 
|-id=210 bgcolor=#E9E9E9
| 240210 ||  || — || September 14, 2002 || Palomar || NEAT || — || align=right | 1.9 km || 
|-id=211 bgcolor=#d6d6d6
| 240211 ||  || — || September 15, 2002 || Palomar || NEAT || — || align=right | 5.3 km || 
|-id=212 bgcolor=#E9E9E9
| 240212 ||  || — || September 4, 2002 || Palomar || NEAT || — || align=right | 2.1 km || 
|-id=213 bgcolor=#E9E9E9
| 240213 ||  || — || September 27, 2002 || Palomar || NEAT || — || align=right | 3.5 km || 
|-id=214 bgcolor=#d6d6d6
| 240214 ||  || — || September 28, 2002 || Haleakala || NEAT || — || align=right | 4.8 km || 
|-id=215 bgcolor=#d6d6d6
| 240215 ||  || — || September 28, 2002 || Haleakala || NEAT || — || align=right | 3.1 km || 
|-id=216 bgcolor=#d6d6d6
| 240216 ||  || — || September 28, 2002 || Haleakala || NEAT || — || align=right | 4.1 km || 
|-id=217 bgcolor=#d6d6d6
| 240217 ||  || — || September 29, 2002 || Eskridge || Farpoint Obs. || EUP || align=right | 4.7 km || 
|-id=218 bgcolor=#d6d6d6
| 240218 ||  || — || September 30, 2002 || Socorro || LINEAR || — || align=right | 5.9 km || 
|-id=219 bgcolor=#E9E9E9
| 240219 ||  || — || September 30, 2002 || Socorro || LINEAR || — || align=right | 2.9 km || 
|-id=220 bgcolor=#E9E9E9
| 240220 ||  || — || September 16, 2002 || Palomar || NEAT || — || align=right | 3.4 km || 
|-id=221 bgcolor=#d6d6d6
| 240221 ||  || — || September 26, 2002 || Palomar || NEAT || — || align=right | 3.9 km || 
|-id=222 bgcolor=#d6d6d6
| 240222 ||  || — || October 1, 2002 || Anderson Mesa || LONEOS || — || align=right | 6.0 km || 
|-id=223 bgcolor=#E9E9E9
| 240223 ||  || — || October 2, 2002 || Socorro || LINEAR || — || align=right | 2.5 km || 
|-id=224 bgcolor=#d6d6d6
| 240224 ||  || — || October 2, 2002 || Socorro || LINEAR || — || align=right | 5.3 km || 
|-id=225 bgcolor=#E9E9E9
| 240225 ||  || — || October 2, 2002 || Socorro || LINEAR || — || align=right | 3.3 km || 
|-id=226 bgcolor=#d6d6d6
| 240226 ||  || — || October 3, 2002 || Socorro || LINEAR || — || align=right | 5.8 km || 
|-id=227 bgcolor=#d6d6d6
| 240227 ||  || — || October 1, 2002 || Anderson Mesa || LONEOS || — || align=right | 4.7 km || 
|-id=228 bgcolor=#d6d6d6
| 240228 ||  || — || October 2, 2002 || Socorro || LINEAR || AEG || align=right | 4.8 km || 
|-id=229 bgcolor=#E9E9E9
| 240229 ||  || — || October 3, 2002 || Palomar || NEAT || JUN || align=right | 2.1 km || 
|-id=230 bgcolor=#d6d6d6
| 240230 ||  || — || October 5, 2002 || Kitt Peak || Spacewatch || THM || align=right | 2.5 km || 
|-id=231 bgcolor=#d6d6d6
| 240231 ||  || — || October 5, 2002 || Palomar || NEAT || — || align=right | 6.3 km || 
|-id=232 bgcolor=#d6d6d6
| 240232 ||  || — || October 3, 2002 || Palomar || NEAT || — || align=right | 7.0 km || 
|-id=233 bgcolor=#E9E9E9
| 240233 ||  || — || October 3, 2002 || Palomar || NEAT || — || align=right | 5.0 km || 
|-id=234 bgcolor=#E9E9E9
| 240234 ||  || — || October 3, 2002 || Socorro || LINEAR || — || align=right | 3.2 km || 
|-id=235 bgcolor=#E9E9E9
| 240235 ||  || — || October 4, 2002 || Socorro || LINEAR || — || align=right | 2.7 km || 
|-id=236 bgcolor=#E9E9E9
| 240236 ||  || — || October 8, 2002 || Anderson Mesa || LONEOS || — || align=right | 3.1 km || 
|-id=237 bgcolor=#d6d6d6
| 240237 ||  || — || October 9, 2002 || Socorro || LINEAR || — || align=right | 4.5 km || 
|-id=238 bgcolor=#d6d6d6
| 240238 ||  || — || October 9, 2002 || Socorro || LINEAR || — || align=right | 4.8 km || 
|-id=239 bgcolor=#E9E9E9
| 240239 ||  || — || October 9, 2002 || Socorro || LINEAR || — || align=right | 3.4 km || 
|-id=240 bgcolor=#d6d6d6
| 240240 ||  || — || October 10, 2002 || Socorro || LINEAR || MEL || align=right | 5.8 km || 
|-id=241 bgcolor=#d6d6d6
| 240241 ||  || — || October 5, 2002 || Apache Point || SDSS || CHA || align=right | 2.6 km || 
|-id=242 bgcolor=#d6d6d6
| 240242 ||  || — || October 4, 2002 || Palomar || NEAT || — || align=right | 3.9 km || 
|-id=243 bgcolor=#d6d6d6
| 240243 ||  || — || October 15, 2002 || Palomar || NEAT || EOS || align=right | 2.5 km || 
|-id=244 bgcolor=#d6d6d6
| 240244 ||  || — || October 28, 2002 || Palomar || NEAT || — || align=right | 4.8 km || 
|-id=245 bgcolor=#E9E9E9
| 240245 ||  || — || October 29, 2002 || Palomar || NEAT || — || align=right | 3.6 km || 
|-id=246 bgcolor=#d6d6d6
| 240246 ||  || — || October 30, 2002 || Haleakala || NEAT || — || align=right | 4.1 km || 
|-id=247 bgcolor=#d6d6d6
| 240247 ||  || — || October 29, 2002 || Kitt Peak || Spacewatch || — || align=right | 5.1 km || 
|-id=248 bgcolor=#d6d6d6
| 240248 ||  || — || October 30, 2002 || Haleakala || NEAT || — || align=right | 3.7 km || 
|-id=249 bgcolor=#E9E9E9
| 240249 ||  || — || October 31, 2002 || Socorro || LINEAR || — || align=right | 1.5 km || 
|-id=250 bgcolor=#d6d6d6
| 240250 ||  || — || October 29, 2002 || Apache Point || SDSS || — || align=right | 4.3 km || 
|-id=251 bgcolor=#E9E9E9
| 240251 ||  || — || October 30, 2002 || Apache Point || SDSS || — || align=right | 3.3 km || 
|-id=252 bgcolor=#d6d6d6
| 240252 ||  || — || October 31, 2002 || Palomar || NEAT || — || align=right | 3.3 km || 
|-id=253 bgcolor=#d6d6d6
| 240253 ||  || — || November 1, 2002 || Palomar || NEAT || — || align=right | 3.9 km || 
|-id=254 bgcolor=#E9E9E9
| 240254 ||  || — || November 2, 2002 || Kvistaberg || UDAS || — || align=right | 2.2 km || 
|-id=255 bgcolor=#d6d6d6
| 240255 ||  || — || November 4, 2002 || Palomar || NEAT || EOS || align=right | 2.8 km || 
|-id=256 bgcolor=#d6d6d6
| 240256 ||  || — || November 6, 2002 || Anderson Mesa || LONEOS || — || align=right | 4.2 km || 
|-id=257 bgcolor=#d6d6d6
| 240257 ||  || — || November 6, 2002 || Socorro || LINEAR || — || align=right | 4.3 km || 
|-id=258 bgcolor=#d6d6d6
| 240258 ||  || — || November 7, 2002 || Anderson Mesa || LONEOS || — || align=right | 5.4 km || 
|-id=259 bgcolor=#d6d6d6
| 240259 ||  || — || November 11, 2002 || Kitt Peak || Spacewatch || — || align=right | 5.0 km || 
|-id=260 bgcolor=#d6d6d6
| 240260 ||  || — || November 11, 2002 || Socorro || LINEAR || — || align=right | 4.0 km || 
|-id=261 bgcolor=#E9E9E9
| 240261 ||  || — || November 12, 2002 || Socorro || LINEAR || — || align=right | 2.6 km || 
|-id=262 bgcolor=#d6d6d6
| 240262 ||  || — || November 12, 2002 || Socorro || LINEAR || — || align=right | 7.7 km || 
|-id=263 bgcolor=#d6d6d6
| 240263 ||  || — || November 11, 2002 || Socorro || LINEAR || ALA || align=right | 5.6 km || 
|-id=264 bgcolor=#E9E9E9
| 240264 ||  || — || November 23, 2002 || Palomar || NEAT || — || align=right | 4.1 km || 
|-id=265 bgcolor=#d6d6d6
| 240265 ||  || — || November 23, 2002 || Palomar || NEAT || — || align=right | 3.2 km || 
|-id=266 bgcolor=#d6d6d6
| 240266 ||  || — || November 22, 2002 || Palomar || NEAT || VER || align=right | 5.3 km || 
|-id=267 bgcolor=#d6d6d6
| 240267 ||  || — || December 1, 2002 || Socorro || LINEAR || — || align=right | 3.7 km || 
|-id=268 bgcolor=#d6d6d6
| 240268 ||  || — || December 3, 2002 || Palomar || NEAT || — || align=right | 4.3 km || 
|-id=269 bgcolor=#d6d6d6
| 240269 ||  || — || December 2, 2002 || Socorro || LINEAR || EUP || align=right | 7.8 km || 
|-id=270 bgcolor=#E9E9E9
| 240270 ||  || — || December 8, 2002 || Haleakala || NEAT || PAE || align=right | 3.4 km || 
|-id=271 bgcolor=#d6d6d6
| 240271 ||  || — || December 9, 2002 || Kitt Peak || Spacewatch || TIR || align=right | 4.4 km || 
|-id=272 bgcolor=#d6d6d6
| 240272 ||  || — || December 15, 2002 || Haleakala || NEAT || TIR || align=right | 4.5 km || 
|-id=273 bgcolor=#fefefe
| 240273 ||  || — || December 5, 2002 || Socorro || LINEAR || — || align=right | 1.7 km || 
|-id=274 bgcolor=#d6d6d6
| 240274 ||  || — || December 5, 2002 || Socorro || LINEAR || — || align=right | 3.4 km || 
|-id=275 bgcolor=#d6d6d6
| 240275 ||  || — || December 3, 2002 || Palomar || NEAT || — || align=right | 3.1 km || 
|-id=276 bgcolor=#fefefe
| 240276 ||  || — || December 27, 2002 || Socorro || LINEAR || — || align=right | 1.4 km || 
|-id=277 bgcolor=#d6d6d6
| 240277 ||  || — || December 31, 2002 || Socorro || LINEAR || — || align=right | 6.3 km || 
|-id=278 bgcolor=#d6d6d6
| 240278 ||  || — || January 1, 2003 || Socorro || LINEAR || — || align=right | 4.4 km || 
|-id=279 bgcolor=#d6d6d6
| 240279 ||  || — || January 5, 2003 || Socorro || LINEAR || EUP || align=right | 7.2 km || 
|-id=280 bgcolor=#d6d6d6
| 240280 ||  || — || January 26, 2003 || Anderson Mesa || LONEOS || ELF || align=right | 6.4 km || 
|-id=281 bgcolor=#fefefe
| 240281 ||  || — || January 27, 2003 || Socorro || LINEAR || — || align=right data-sort-value="0.82" | 820 m || 
|-id=282 bgcolor=#E9E9E9
| 240282 ||  || — || January 30, 2003 || Anderson Mesa || LONEOS || DOR || align=right | 3.9 km || 
|-id=283 bgcolor=#d6d6d6
| 240283 ||  || — || February 1, 2003 || Socorro || LINEAR || — || align=right | 5.5 km || 
|-id=284 bgcolor=#fefefe
| 240284 ||  || — || February 22, 2003 || Palomar || NEAT || FLO || align=right data-sort-value="0.86" | 860 m || 
|-id=285 bgcolor=#fefefe
| 240285 ||  || — || March 4, 2003 || Saint-Véran || Saint-Véran Obs. || — || align=right | 2.0 km || 
|-id=286 bgcolor=#d6d6d6
| 240286 ||  || — || March 6, 2003 || Anderson Mesa || LONEOS || — || align=right | 5.8 km || 
|-id=287 bgcolor=#fefefe
| 240287 ||  || — || March 6, 2003 || Anderson Mesa || LONEOS || — || align=right data-sort-value="0.95" | 950 m || 
|-id=288 bgcolor=#fefefe
| 240288 ||  || — || March 6, 2003 || Socorro || LINEAR || — || align=right | 1.1 km || 
|-id=289 bgcolor=#fefefe
| 240289 ||  || — || March 6, 2003 || Socorro || LINEAR || — || align=right | 1.2 km || 
|-id=290 bgcolor=#fefefe
| 240290 ||  || — || March 11, 2003 || Palomar || NEAT || — || align=right data-sort-value="0.90" | 900 m || 
|-id=291 bgcolor=#d6d6d6
| 240291 ||  || — || March 8, 2003 || Anderson Mesa || LONEOS || EUP || align=right | 7.5 km || 
|-id=292 bgcolor=#FA8072
| 240292 ||  || — || March 11, 2003 || Palomar || NEAT || PHO || align=right | 1.1 km || 
|-id=293 bgcolor=#fefefe
| 240293 ||  || — || March 12, 2003 || Socorro || LINEAR || — || align=right | 1.5 km || 
|-id=294 bgcolor=#fefefe
| 240294 ||  || — || March 12, 2003 || Kitt Peak || Spacewatch || — || align=right data-sort-value="0.81" | 810 m || 
|-id=295 bgcolor=#d6d6d6
| 240295 ||  || — || March 23, 2003 || Ondřejov || L. Kotková || — || align=right | 4.6 km || 
|-id=296 bgcolor=#fefefe
| 240296 ||  || — || March 24, 2003 || Socorro || LINEAR || PHO || align=right | 2.6 km || 
|-id=297 bgcolor=#fefefe
| 240297 ||  || — || March 23, 2003 || Catalina || CSS || — || align=right data-sort-value="0.97" | 970 m || 
|-id=298 bgcolor=#fefefe
| 240298 ||  || — || March 24, 2003 || Kitt Peak || Spacewatch || — || align=right | 1.0 km || 
|-id=299 bgcolor=#fefefe
| 240299 ||  || — || March 25, 2003 || Haleakala || NEAT || — || align=right | 1.2 km || 
|-id=300 bgcolor=#fefefe
| 240300 ||  || — || March 26, 2003 || Palomar || NEAT || FLO || align=right data-sort-value="0.96" | 960 m || 
|}

240301–240400 

|-bgcolor=#fefefe
| 240301 ||  || — || March 26, 2003 || Palomar || NEAT || — || align=right data-sort-value="0.94" | 940 m || 
|-id=302 bgcolor=#fefefe
| 240302 ||  || — || March 27, 2003 || Kitt Peak || Spacewatch || — || align=right | 1.1 km || 
|-id=303 bgcolor=#fefefe
| 240303 ||  || — || March 28, 2003 || Kitt Peak || Spacewatch || — || align=right | 1.4 km || 
|-id=304 bgcolor=#fefefe
| 240304 ||  || — || March 28, 2003 || Kitt Peak || Spacewatch || FLO || align=right | 1.0 km || 
|-id=305 bgcolor=#fefefe
| 240305 ||  || — || March 29, 2003 || Anderson Mesa || LONEOS || — || align=right | 1.0 km || 
|-id=306 bgcolor=#d6d6d6
| 240306 ||  || — || March 29, 2003 || Anderson Mesa || LONEOS || LIX || align=right | 6.5 km || 
|-id=307 bgcolor=#fefefe
| 240307 ||  || — || March 30, 2003 || Socorro || LINEAR || FLO || align=right | 1.3 km || 
|-id=308 bgcolor=#fefefe
| 240308 ||  || — || March 31, 2003 || Anderson Mesa || LONEOS || — || align=right | 1.3 km || 
|-id=309 bgcolor=#fefefe
| 240309 ||  || — || March 24, 2003 || Kitt Peak || Spacewatch || FLO || align=right data-sort-value="0.82" | 820 m || 
|-id=310 bgcolor=#d6d6d6
| 240310 ||  || — || March 22, 2003 || Palomar || NEAT || VER || align=right | 5.1 km || 
|-id=311 bgcolor=#fefefe
| 240311 ||  || — || April 2, 2003 || Socorro || LINEAR || — || align=right | 1.2 km || 
|-id=312 bgcolor=#fefefe
| 240312 ||  || — || April 3, 2003 || Anderson Mesa || LONEOS || — || align=right data-sort-value="0.76" | 760 m || 
|-id=313 bgcolor=#FA8072
| 240313 ||  || — || April 9, 2003 || Socorro || LINEAR || — || align=right data-sort-value="0.99" | 990 m || 
|-id=314 bgcolor=#fefefe
| 240314 ||  || — || April 7, 2003 || Kitt Peak || Spacewatch || FLO || align=right data-sort-value="0.80" | 800 m || 
|-id=315 bgcolor=#fefefe
| 240315 ||  || — || April 21, 2003 || Kitt Peak || Spacewatch || NYS || align=right | 1.9 km || 
|-id=316 bgcolor=#fefefe
| 240316 ||  || — || April 26, 2003 || Haleakala || NEAT || — || align=right | 1.3 km || 
|-id=317 bgcolor=#fefefe
| 240317 ||  || — || April 25, 2003 || Kitt Peak || Spacewatch || — || align=right data-sort-value="0.94" | 940 m || 
|-id=318 bgcolor=#fefefe
| 240318 ||  || — || April 27, 2003 || Anderson Mesa || LONEOS || V || align=right data-sort-value="0.89" | 890 m || 
|-id=319 bgcolor=#fefefe
| 240319 ||  || — || April 28, 2003 || Anderson Mesa || LONEOS || — || align=right | 2.7 km || 
|-id=320 bgcolor=#FFC2E0
| 240320 ||  || — || April 29, 2003 || Socorro || LINEAR || AMO || align=right data-sort-value="0.33" | 330 m || 
|-id=321 bgcolor=#fefefe
| 240321 ||  || — || May 1, 2003 || Socorro || LINEAR || V || align=right | 1.0 km || 
|-id=322 bgcolor=#fefefe
| 240322 ||  || — || May 26, 2003 || Haleakala || NEAT || ERI || align=right | 2.1 km || 
|-id=323 bgcolor=#fefefe
| 240323 ||  || — || May 28, 2003 || Kitt Peak || Spacewatch || NYS || align=right data-sort-value="0.96" | 960 m || 
|-id=324 bgcolor=#fefefe
| 240324 ||  || — || May 30, 2003 || Socorro || LINEAR || — || align=right | 1.8 km || 
|-id=325 bgcolor=#fefefe
| 240325 ||  || — || June 1, 2003 || Kitt Peak || Spacewatch || NYS || align=right | 2.9 km || 
|-id=326 bgcolor=#fefefe
| 240326 || 2003 ML || — || June 21, 2003 || Nashville || R. Clingan || — || align=right data-sort-value="0.94" | 940 m || 
|-id=327 bgcolor=#fefefe
| 240327 ||  || — || June 26, 2003 || Socorro || LINEAR || — || align=right | 1.5 km || 
|-id=328 bgcolor=#fefefe
| 240328 ||  || — || June 29, 2003 || Reedy Creek || J. Broughton || ERI || align=right | 2.5 km || 
|-id=329 bgcolor=#fefefe
| 240329 ||  || — || July 4, 2003 || Reedy Creek || J. Broughton || NYS || align=right data-sort-value="0.94" | 940 m || 
|-id=330 bgcolor=#fefefe
| 240330 ||  || — || July 6, 2003 || Kitt Peak || Spacewatch || — || align=right | 1.2 km || 
|-id=331 bgcolor=#fefefe
| 240331 ||  || — || July 22, 2003 || Campo Imperatore || CINEOS || MAS || align=right | 1.1 km || 
|-id=332 bgcolor=#fefefe
| 240332 ||  || — || July 21, 2003 || Campo Imperatore || CINEOS || — || align=right | 1.2 km || 
|-id=333 bgcolor=#fefefe
| 240333 ||  || — || July 25, 2003 || Socorro || LINEAR || NYS || align=right data-sort-value="0.77" | 770 m || 
|-id=334 bgcolor=#E9E9E9
| 240334 ||  || — || July 24, 2003 || Palomar || NEAT || — || align=right | 1.3 km || 
|-id=335 bgcolor=#fefefe
| 240335 ||  || — || August 2, 2003 || Haleakala || NEAT || V || align=right | 1.1 km || 
|-id=336 bgcolor=#fefefe
| 240336 ||  || — || August 7, 2003 || Haleakala || NEAT || PHO || align=right | 1.5 km || 
|-id=337 bgcolor=#fefefe
| 240337 ||  || — || August 22, 2003 || Palomar || NEAT || — || align=right | 1.2 km || 
|-id=338 bgcolor=#fefefe
| 240338 ||  || — || August 21, 2003 || Palomar || NEAT || NYS || align=right | 1.0 km || 
|-id=339 bgcolor=#fefefe
| 240339 ||  || — || August 21, 2003 || Campo Imperatore || CINEOS || — || align=right | 1.2 km || 
|-id=340 bgcolor=#E9E9E9
| 240340 ||  || — || August 22, 2003 || Palomar || NEAT || — || align=right | 1.0 km || 
|-id=341 bgcolor=#E9E9E9
| 240341 ||  || — || August 23, 2003 || Palomar || NEAT || — || align=right | 1.8 km || 
|-id=342 bgcolor=#fefefe
| 240342 ||  || — || August 23, 2003 || Palomar || NEAT || H || align=right data-sort-value="0.80" | 800 m || 
|-id=343 bgcolor=#fefefe
| 240343 ||  || — || August 23, 2003 || Palomar || NEAT || NYS || align=right data-sort-value="0.96" | 960 m || 
|-id=344 bgcolor=#fefefe
| 240344 ||  || — || August 24, 2003 || Socorro || LINEAR || — || align=right | 1.3 km || 
|-id=345 bgcolor=#fefefe
| 240345 ||  || — || August 23, 2003 || Palomar || NEAT || — || align=right | 2.0 km || 
|-id=346 bgcolor=#fefefe
| 240346 ||  || — || August 25, 2003 || Socorro || LINEAR || — || align=right | 1.1 km || 
|-id=347 bgcolor=#fefefe
| 240347 ||  || — || August 28, 2003 || Haleakala || NEAT || NYS || align=right | 1.1 km || 
|-id=348 bgcolor=#fefefe
| 240348 ||  || — || August 28, 2003 || Haleakala || NEAT || NYS || align=right data-sort-value="0.93" | 930 m || 
|-id=349 bgcolor=#E9E9E9
| 240349 ||  || — || August 30, 2003 || Haleakala || NEAT || — || align=right | 2.6 km || 
|-id=350 bgcolor=#fefefe
| 240350 ||  || — || August 31, 2003 || Socorro || LINEAR || — || align=right | 2.3 km || 
|-id=351 bgcolor=#fefefe
| 240351 ||  || — || September 1, 2003 || Socorro || LINEAR || NYS || align=right data-sort-value="0.91" | 910 m || 
|-id=352 bgcolor=#fefefe
| 240352 ||  || — || September 1, 2003 || Socorro || LINEAR || — || align=right | 1.2 km || 
|-id=353 bgcolor=#fefefe
| 240353 ||  || — || September 16, 2003 || Palomar || NEAT || NYS || align=right data-sort-value="0.81" | 810 m || 
|-id=354 bgcolor=#E9E9E9
| 240354 ||  || — || September 16, 2003 || Kitt Peak || Spacewatch || ADE || align=right | 2.9 km || 
|-id=355 bgcolor=#d6d6d6
| 240355 ||  || — || September 16, 2003 || Kitt Peak || Spacewatch || — || align=right | 3.6 km || 
|-id=356 bgcolor=#E9E9E9
| 240356 ||  || — || September 16, 2003 || Kitt Peak || Spacewatch || MRX || align=right | 1.7 km || 
|-id=357 bgcolor=#E9E9E9
| 240357 ||  || — || September 16, 2003 || Palomar || NEAT || — || align=right | 3.5 km || 
|-id=358 bgcolor=#fefefe
| 240358 ||  || — || September 16, 2003 || Anderson Mesa || LONEOS || NYS || align=right data-sort-value="0.95" | 950 m || 
|-id=359 bgcolor=#E9E9E9
| 240359 ||  || — || September 16, 2003 || Anderson Mesa || LONEOS || — || align=right | 1.7 km || 
|-id=360 bgcolor=#E9E9E9
| 240360 ||  || — || September 17, 2003 || Kitt Peak || Spacewatch || — || align=right | 1.9 km || 
|-id=361 bgcolor=#E9E9E9
| 240361 ||  || — || September 20, 2003 || Palomar || NEAT || — || align=right | 2.7 km || 
|-id=362 bgcolor=#E9E9E9
| 240362 ||  || — || September 16, 2003 || Socorro || LINEAR || — || align=right | 1.8 km || 
|-id=363 bgcolor=#E9E9E9
| 240363 ||  || — || September 20, 2003 || Kitt Peak || Spacewatch || RAF || align=right | 1.8 km || 
|-id=364 bgcolor=#fefefe
| 240364 Kozmutza ||  ||  || September 20, 2003 || Piszkéstető || K. Sárneczky, B. Sipőcz || MAS || align=right data-sort-value="0.79" | 790 m || 
|-id=365 bgcolor=#fefefe
| 240365 ||  || — || September 20, 2003 || Palomar || NEAT || — || align=right | 3.0 km || 
|-id=366 bgcolor=#d6d6d6
| 240366 ||  || — || September 21, 2003 || Kitt Peak || Spacewatch || — || align=right | 4.5 km || 
|-id=367 bgcolor=#fefefe
| 240367 ||  || — || September 23, 2003 || Haleakala || NEAT || V || align=right data-sort-value="0.86" | 860 m || 
|-id=368 bgcolor=#fefefe
| 240368 ||  || — || September 23, 2003 || Haleakala || NEAT || NYS || align=right data-sort-value="0.78" | 780 m || 
|-id=369 bgcolor=#E9E9E9
| 240369 ||  || — || September 18, 2003 || Kitt Peak || Spacewatch || — || align=right | 1.4 km || 
|-id=370 bgcolor=#E9E9E9
| 240370 ||  || — || September 28, 2003 || Desert Eagle || W. K. Y. Yeung || GEF || align=right | 1.7 km || 
|-id=371 bgcolor=#d6d6d6
| 240371 ||  || — || September 19, 2003 || Kitt Peak || Spacewatch || IMH || align=right | 3.1 km || 
|-id=372 bgcolor=#fefefe
| 240372 ||  || — || September 30, 2003 || Drebach || Drebach Obs. || H || align=right data-sort-value="0.80" | 800 m || 
|-id=373 bgcolor=#E9E9E9
| 240373 ||  || — || September 26, 2003 || Socorro || LINEAR || — || align=right | 2.1 km || 
|-id=374 bgcolor=#fefefe
| 240374 ||  || — || September 26, 2003 || Socorro || LINEAR || ERI || align=right | 2.2 km || 
|-id=375 bgcolor=#E9E9E9
| 240375 ||  || — || September 26, 2003 || Socorro || LINEAR || — || align=right | 2.1 km || 
|-id=376 bgcolor=#E9E9E9
| 240376 ||  || — || September 26, 2003 || Socorro || LINEAR || — || align=right | 2.5 km || 
|-id=377 bgcolor=#fefefe
| 240377 ||  || — || September 27, 2003 || Kitt Peak || Spacewatch || H || align=right data-sort-value="0.73" | 730 m || 
|-id=378 bgcolor=#fefefe
| 240378 ||  || — || September 28, 2003 || Kitt Peak || Spacewatch || — || align=right | 1.1 km || 
|-id=379 bgcolor=#fefefe
| 240379 ||  || — || September 28, 2003 || Anderson Mesa || LONEOS || V || align=right data-sort-value="0.92" | 920 m || 
|-id=380 bgcolor=#E9E9E9
| 240380 ||  || — || September 27, 2003 || Socorro || LINEAR || — || align=right | 1.3 km || 
|-id=381 bgcolor=#E9E9E9
| 240381 Emilchyne ||  ||  || September 29, 2003 || Andrushivka || Andrushivka Obs. || — || align=right | 1.2 km || 
|-id=382 bgcolor=#fefefe
| 240382 ||  || — || September 16, 2003 || Kitt Peak || Spacewatch || — || align=right | 1.0 km || 
|-id=383 bgcolor=#E9E9E9
| 240383 ||  || — || September 26, 2003 || Apache Point || SDSS || — || align=right | 2.3 km || 
|-id=384 bgcolor=#d6d6d6
| 240384 ||  || — || September 18, 2003 || Kitt Peak || Spacewatch || BRA || align=right | 2.5 km || 
|-id=385 bgcolor=#E9E9E9
| 240385 ||  || — || October 1, 2003 || Fountain Hills || C. W. Juels, P. R. Holvorcem || — || align=right | 3.2 km || 
|-id=386 bgcolor=#E9E9E9
| 240386 ||  || — || October 3, 2003 || Kitt Peak || Spacewatch || — || align=right | 2.6 km || 
|-id=387 bgcolor=#E9E9E9
| 240387 ||  || — || October 5, 2003 || Socorro || LINEAR || INO || align=right | 1.5 km || 
|-id=388 bgcolor=#fefefe
| 240388 ||  || — || October 18, 2003 || Palomar || NEAT || H || align=right data-sort-value="0.92" | 920 m || 
|-id=389 bgcolor=#fefefe
| 240389 ||  || — || October 16, 2003 || Anderson Mesa || LONEOS || — || align=right | 1.4 km || 
|-id=390 bgcolor=#E9E9E9
| 240390 ||  || — || October 16, 2003 || Anderson Mesa || LONEOS || — || align=right | 1.3 km || 
|-id=391 bgcolor=#E9E9E9
| 240391 ||  || — || October 17, 2003 || Kitt Peak || Spacewatch || — || align=right | 2.6 km || 
|-id=392 bgcolor=#E9E9E9
| 240392 ||  || — || October 16, 2003 || Anderson Mesa || LONEOS || MRX || align=right | 1.4 km || 
|-id=393 bgcolor=#E9E9E9
| 240393 ||  || — || October 16, 2003 || Palomar || NEAT || — || align=right | 3.5 km || 
|-id=394 bgcolor=#fefefe
| 240394 ||  || — || October 17, 2003 || Kitt Peak || Spacewatch || H || align=right data-sort-value="0.80" | 800 m || 
|-id=395 bgcolor=#E9E9E9
| 240395 ||  || — || October 17, 2003 || Kitt Peak || Spacewatch || EUN || align=right | 1.7 km || 
|-id=396 bgcolor=#E9E9E9
| 240396 ||  || — || October 18, 2003 || Kitt Peak || Spacewatch || — || align=right | 1.8 km || 
|-id=397 bgcolor=#d6d6d6
| 240397 ||  || — || October 20, 2003 || Socorro || LINEAR || — || align=right | 3.7 km || 
|-id=398 bgcolor=#E9E9E9
| 240398 ||  || — || October 18, 2003 || Kitt Peak || Spacewatch || — || align=right | 2.9 km || 
|-id=399 bgcolor=#E9E9E9
| 240399 ||  || — || October 19, 2003 || Kitt Peak || Spacewatch || WIT || align=right | 1.2 km || 
|-id=400 bgcolor=#fefefe
| 240400 ||  || — || October 16, 2003 || Anderson Mesa || LONEOS || — || align=right | 1.2 km || 
|}

240401–240500 

|-bgcolor=#E9E9E9
| 240401 ||  || — || October 22, 2003 || Socorro || LINEAR || MIS || align=right | 4.1 km || 
|-id=402 bgcolor=#E9E9E9
| 240402 ||  || — || October 21, 2003 || Kitt Peak || Spacewatch || HNA || align=right | 3.5 km || 
|-id=403 bgcolor=#E9E9E9
| 240403 ||  || — || October 21, 2003 || Palomar || NEAT || — || align=right | 1.0 km || 
|-id=404 bgcolor=#E9E9E9
| 240404 ||  || — || October 21, 2003 || Palomar || NEAT || — || align=right | 2.0 km || 
|-id=405 bgcolor=#E9E9E9
| 240405 ||  || — || October 20, 2003 || Kitt Peak || Spacewatch || — || align=right | 3.1 km || 
|-id=406 bgcolor=#E9E9E9
| 240406 ||  || — || October 21, 2003 || Socorro || LINEAR || — || align=right | 1.9 km || 
|-id=407 bgcolor=#E9E9E9
| 240407 ||  || — || October 21, 2003 || Kitt Peak || Spacewatch || — || align=right | 3.9 km || 
|-id=408 bgcolor=#E9E9E9
| 240408 ||  || — || October 23, 2003 || Anderson Mesa || LONEOS || HNS || align=right | 1.8 km || 
|-id=409 bgcolor=#E9E9E9
| 240409 ||  || — || October 23, 2003 || Kitt Peak || Spacewatch || — || align=right | 2.5 km || 
|-id=410 bgcolor=#E9E9E9
| 240410 ||  || — || October 25, 2003 || Socorro || LINEAR || WIT || align=right | 1.4 km || 
|-id=411 bgcolor=#E9E9E9
| 240411 ||  || — || October 25, 2003 || Socorro || LINEAR || — || align=right | 1.6 km || 
|-id=412 bgcolor=#E9E9E9
| 240412 ||  || — || October 25, 2003 || Socorro || LINEAR || GAL || align=right | 2.5 km || 
|-id=413 bgcolor=#E9E9E9
| 240413 ||  || — || October 27, 2003 || Socorro || LINEAR || — || align=right | 1.5 km || 
|-id=414 bgcolor=#E9E9E9
| 240414 ||  || — || October 18, 2003 || Anderson Mesa || LONEOS || KRM || align=right | 3.0 km || 
|-id=415 bgcolor=#E9E9E9
| 240415 ||  || — || October 25, 2003 || Socorro || LINEAR || INO || align=right | 1.6 km || 
|-id=416 bgcolor=#E9E9E9
| 240416 ||  || — || October 19, 2003 || Apache Point || SDSS || — || align=right | 1.1 km || 
|-id=417 bgcolor=#E9E9E9
| 240417 ||  || — || October 20, 2003 || Kitt Peak || Spacewatch || MAR || align=right | 1.8 km || 
|-id=418 bgcolor=#E9E9E9
| 240418 ||  || — || November 15, 2003 || Kitt Peak || Spacewatch || — || align=right | 1.2 km || 
|-id=419 bgcolor=#E9E9E9
| 240419 ||  || — || November 16, 2003 || Catalina || CSS || HOF || align=right | 4.0 km || 
|-id=420 bgcolor=#E9E9E9
| 240420 ||  || — || November 16, 2003 || Kitt Peak || Spacewatch || AER || align=right | 2.1 km || 
|-id=421 bgcolor=#d6d6d6
| 240421 ||  || — || November 18, 2003 || Palomar || NEAT || — || align=right | 9.1 km || 
|-id=422 bgcolor=#E9E9E9
| 240422 ||  || — || November 18, 2003 || Palomar || NEAT || — || align=right | 2.1 km || 
|-id=423 bgcolor=#E9E9E9
| 240423 ||  || — || November 19, 2003 || Kitt Peak || Spacewatch || — || align=right | 3.3 km || 
|-id=424 bgcolor=#E9E9E9
| 240424 ||  || — || November 19, 2003 || Kitt Peak || Spacewatch || — || align=right | 2.2 km || 
|-id=425 bgcolor=#E9E9E9
| 240425 ||  || — || November 20, 2003 || Kitt Peak || Spacewatch || — || align=right | 2.3 km || 
|-id=426 bgcolor=#E9E9E9
| 240426 ||  || — || November 18, 2003 || Kitt Peak || Spacewatch || — || align=right | 3.7 km || 
|-id=427 bgcolor=#E9E9E9
| 240427 ||  || — || November 19, 2003 || Kitt Peak || Spacewatch || — || align=right | 3.3 km || 
|-id=428 bgcolor=#E9E9E9
| 240428 ||  || — || November 19, 2003 || Kitt Peak || Spacewatch || — || align=right | 3.2 km || 
|-id=429 bgcolor=#d6d6d6
| 240429 ||  || — || November 19, 2003 || Kitt Peak || Spacewatch || — || align=right | 4.8 km || 
|-id=430 bgcolor=#E9E9E9
| 240430 ||  || — || November 19, 2003 || Kitt Peak || Spacewatch || — || align=right | 2.3 km || 
|-id=431 bgcolor=#E9E9E9
| 240431 ||  || — || November 18, 2003 || Palomar || NEAT || — || align=right | 3.9 km || 
|-id=432 bgcolor=#d6d6d6
| 240432 ||  || — || November 19, 2003 || Anderson Mesa || LONEOS || — || align=right | 3.2 km || 
|-id=433 bgcolor=#d6d6d6
| 240433 ||  || — || November 20, 2003 || Socorro || LINEAR || LIX || align=right | 5.3 km || 
|-id=434 bgcolor=#E9E9E9
| 240434 ||  || — || November 21, 2003 || Socorro || LINEAR || HOF || align=right | 3.7 km || 
|-id=435 bgcolor=#E9E9E9
| 240435 ||  || — || November 21, 2003 || Socorro || LINEAR || — || align=right | 3.1 km || 
|-id=436 bgcolor=#E9E9E9
| 240436 ||  || — || November 26, 2003 || Kitt Peak || Spacewatch || — || align=right | 4.1 km || 
|-id=437 bgcolor=#d6d6d6
| 240437 ||  || — || November 29, 2003 || Socorro || LINEAR || — || align=right | 6.5 km || 
|-id=438 bgcolor=#E9E9E9
| 240438 ||  || — || November 30, 2003 || Kitt Peak || Spacewatch || — || align=right | 1.4 km || 
|-id=439 bgcolor=#E9E9E9
| 240439 ||  || — || December 11, 2003 || Socorro || LINEAR || BRU || align=right | 7.0 km || 
|-id=440 bgcolor=#E9E9E9
| 240440 ||  || — || December 1, 2003 || Kitt Peak || Spacewatch || — || align=right | 2.6 km || 
|-id=441 bgcolor=#E9E9E9
| 240441 ||  || — || December 14, 2003 || Kitt Peak || Spacewatch || — || align=right | 1.5 km || 
|-id=442 bgcolor=#fefefe
| 240442 ||  || — || December 20, 2003 || Socorro || LINEAR || H || align=right | 1.2 km || 
|-id=443 bgcolor=#E9E9E9
| 240443 ||  || — || December 17, 2003 || Kitt Peak || Spacewatch || — || align=right | 3.0 km || 
|-id=444 bgcolor=#E9E9E9
| 240444 ||  || — || December 17, 2003 || Socorro || LINEAR || EUN || align=right | 2.4 km || 
|-id=445 bgcolor=#d6d6d6
| 240445 ||  || — || December 17, 2003 || Anderson Mesa || LONEOS || — || align=right | 5.6 km || 
|-id=446 bgcolor=#E9E9E9
| 240446 ||  || — || December 17, 2003 || Socorro || LINEAR || — || align=right | 3.1 km || 
|-id=447 bgcolor=#E9E9E9
| 240447 ||  || — || December 17, 2003 || Anderson Mesa || LONEOS || GEF || align=right | 2.1 km || 
|-id=448 bgcolor=#d6d6d6
| 240448 ||  || — || December 17, 2003 || Kitt Peak || Spacewatch || — || align=right | 3.1 km || 
|-id=449 bgcolor=#d6d6d6
| 240449 ||  || — || December 18, 2003 || Socorro || LINEAR || EUP || align=right | 5.9 km || 
|-id=450 bgcolor=#d6d6d6
| 240450 ||  || — || December 18, 2003 || Socorro || LINEAR || — || align=right | 6.4 km || 
|-id=451 bgcolor=#d6d6d6
| 240451 ||  || — || December 19, 2003 || Kitt Peak || Spacewatch || — || align=right | 4.9 km || 
|-id=452 bgcolor=#d6d6d6
| 240452 ||  || — || December 18, 2003 || Socorro || LINEAR || — || align=right | 5.4 km || 
|-id=453 bgcolor=#E9E9E9
| 240453 ||  || — || December 19, 2003 || Socorro || LINEAR || — || align=right | 4.1 km || 
|-id=454 bgcolor=#E9E9E9
| 240454 ||  || — || December 19, 2003 || Socorro || LINEAR || — || align=right | 2.3 km || 
|-id=455 bgcolor=#fefefe
| 240455 ||  || — || December 21, 2003 || Catalina || CSS || H || align=right data-sort-value="0.79" | 790 m || 
|-id=456 bgcolor=#E9E9E9
| 240456 ||  || — || December 21, 2003 || Socorro || LINEAR || HEN || align=right | 1.5 km || 
|-id=457 bgcolor=#fefefe
| 240457 ||  || — || December 21, 2003 || Socorro || LINEAR || — || align=right | 2.7 km || 
|-id=458 bgcolor=#d6d6d6
| 240458 ||  || — || December 27, 2003 || Socorro || LINEAR || — || align=right | 4.8 km || 
|-id=459 bgcolor=#d6d6d6
| 240459 ||  || — || December 27, 2003 || Socorro || LINEAR || — || align=right | 3.3 km || 
|-id=460 bgcolor=#E9E9E9
| 240460 ||  || — || December 28, 2003 || Socorro || LINEAR || — || align=right | 4.2 km || 
|-id=461 bgcolor=#d6d6d6
| 240461 ||  || — || December 28, 2003 || Socorro || LINEAR || — || align=right | 3.8 km || 
|-id=462 bgcolor=#d6d6d6
| 240462 ||  || — || December 28, 2003 || Socorro || LINEAR || — || align=right | 4.8 km || 
|-id=463 bgcolor=#E9E9E9
| 240463 ||  || — || December 28, 2003 || Socorro || LINEAR || MIT || align=right | 3.9 km || 
|-id=464 bgcolor=#d6d6d6
| 240464 ||  || — || December 29, 2003 || Catalina || CSS || — || align=right | 2.1 km || 
|-id=465 bgcolor=#d6d6d6
| 240465 ||  || — || January 16, 2004 || Kitt Peak || Spacewatch || — || align=right | 2.1 km || 
|-id=466 bgcolor=#d6d6d6
| 240466 ||  || — || January 16, 2004 || Palomar || NEAT || — || align=right | 4.0 km || 
|-id=467 bgcolor=#d6d6d6
| 240467 ||  || — || January 18, 2004 || Palomar || NEAT || TIR || align=right | 3.4 km || 
|-id=468 bgcolor=#d6d6d6
| 240468 ||  || — || January 18, 2004 || Palomar || NEAT || — || align=right | 3.7 km || 
|-id=469 bgcolor=#d6d6d6
| 240469 ||  || — || January 19, 2004 || Kitt Peak || Spacewatch || CHA || align=right | 3.2 km || 
|-id=470 bgcolor=#d6d6d6
| 240470 ||  || — || January 19, 2004 || Kitt Peak || Spacewatch || FIR || align=right | 4.9 km || 
|-id=471 bgcolor=#d6d6d6
| 240471 ||  || — || January 19, 2004 || Kitt Peak || Spacewatch || THM || align=right | 3.3 km || 
|-id=472 bgcolor=#d6d6d6
| 240472 ||  || — || January 23, 2004 || Anderson Mesa || LONEOS || — || align=right | 5.7 km || 
|-id=473 bgcolor=#E9E9E9
| 240473 ||  || — || January 22, 2004 || Socorro || LINEAR || — || align=right | 2.2 km || 
|-id=474 bgcolor=#d6d6d6
| 240474 ||  || — || January 22, 2004 || Socorro || LINEAR || KOR || align=right | 1.9 km || 
|-id=475 bgcolor=#d6d6d6
| 240475 ||  || — || January 22, 2004 || Socorro || LINEAR || KAR || align=right | 1.4 km || 
|-id=476 bgcolor=#d6d6d6
| 240476 ||  || — || January 24, 2004 || Socorro || LINEAR || — || align=right | 3.4 km || 
|-id=477 bgcolor=#d6d6d6
| 240477 ||  || — || January 22, 2004 || Socorro || LINEAR || — || align=right | 2.6 km || 
|-id=478 bgcolor=#d6d6d6
| 240478 ||  || — || January 25, 2004 || Haleakala || NEAT || — || align=right | 2.5 km || 
|-id=479 bgcolor=#d6d6d6
| 240479 ||  || — || January 22, 2004 || Socorro || LINEAR || — || align=right | 2.3 km || 
|-id=480 bgcolor=#d6d6d6
| 240480 ||  || — || January 23, 2004 || Socorro || LINEAR || — || align=right | 2.5 km || 
|-id=481 bgcolor=#d6d6d6
| 240481 ||  || — || January 30, 2004 || Catalina || CSS || EUP || align=right | 6.1 km || 
|-id=482 bgcolor=#d6d6d6
| 240482 ||  || — || January 24, 2004 || Socorro || LINEAR || — || align=right | 3.1 km || 
|-id=483 bgcolor=#d6d6d6
| 240483 ||  || — || January 28, 2004 || Catalina || CSS || — || align=right | 2.8 km || 
|-id=484 bgcolor=#d6d6d6
| 240484 ||  || — || January 28, 2004 || Catalina || CSS || — || align=right | 4.3 km || 
|-id=485 bgcolor=#d6d6d6
| 240485 ||  || — || January 17, 2004 || Palomar || NEAT || — || align=right | 4.0 km || 
|-id=486 bgcolor=#d6d6d6
| 240486 ||  || — || January 28, 2004 || Kitt Peak || Spacewatch || — || align=right | 3.3 km || 
|-id=487 bgcolor=#d6d6d6
| 240487 ||  || — || February 11, 2004 || Palomar || NEAT || HYG || align=right | 3.6 km || 
|-id=488 bgcolor=#d6d6d6
| 240488 ||  || — || February 12, 2004 || Palomar || NEAT || — || align=right | 5.1 km || 
|-id=489 bgcolor=#d6d6d6
| 240489 ||  || — || February 11, 2004 || Kitt Peak || Spacewatch || — || align=right | 3.7 km || 
|-id=490 bgcolor=#d6d6d6
| 240490 ||  || — || February 13, 2004 || Kitt Peak || Spacewatch || — || align=right | 3.5 km || 
|-id=491 bgcolor=#d6d6d6
| 240491 ||  || — || February 2, 2004 || Haleakala || NEAT || — || align=right | 3.4 km || 
|-id=492 bgcolor=#d6d6d6
| 240492 ||  || — || February 11, 2004 || Palomar || NEAT || — || align=right | 4.0 km || 
|-id=493 bgcolor=#d6d6d6
| 240493 ||  || — || February 13, 2004 || Palomar || NEAT || THB || align=right | 3.2 km || 
|-id=494 bgcolor=#d6d6d6
| 240494 ||  || — || February 16, 2004 || Kitt Peak || Spacewatch || — || align=right | 3.1 km || 
|-id=495 bgcolor=#d6d6d6
| 240495 ||  || — || February 23, 2004 || Socorro || LINEAR || — || align=right | 3.5 km || 
|-id=496 bgcolor=#d6d6d6
| 240496 ||  || — || February 23, 2004 || Socorro || LINEAR || — || align=right | 2.7 km || 
|-id=497 bgcolor=#d6d6d6
| 240497 ||  || — || March 11, 2004 || Palomar || NEAT || — || align=right | 5.1 km || 
|-id=498 bgcolor=#d6d6d6
| 240498 ||  || — || March 12, 2004 || Palomar || NEAT || — || align=right | 3.0 km || 
|-id=499 bgcolor=#d6d6d6
| 240499 ||  || — || March 15, 2004 || Catalina || CSS || — || align=right | 5.3 km || 
|-id=500 bgcolor=#d6d6d6
| 240500 ||  || — || March 14, 2004 || Kitt Peak || Spacewatch || EOS || align=right | 3.3 km || 
|}

240501–240600 

|-bgcolor=#d6d6d6
| 240501 ||  || — || March 12, 2004 || Palomar || NEAT || — || align=right | 3.3 km || 
|-id=502 bgcolor=#d6d6d6
| 240502 ||  || — || March 14, 2004 || Palomar || NEAT || — || align=right | 5.2 km || 
|-id=503 bgcolor=#d6d6d6
| 240503 ||  || — || March 15, 2004 || Socorro || LINEAR || — || align=right | 4.9 km || 
|-id=504 bgcolor=#d6d6d6
| 240504 ||  || — || March 15, 2004 || Campo Imperatore || CINEOS || — || align=right | 2.5 km || 
|-id=505 bgcolor=#d6d6d6
| 240505 ||  || — || March 12, 2004 || Palomar || NEAT || SYL7:4 || align=right | 6.9 km || 
|-id=506 bgcolor=#d6d6d6
| 240506 ||  || — || March 13, 2004 || Palomar || NEAT || — || align=right | 3.0 km || 
|-id=507 bgcolor=#d6d6d6
| 240507 ||  || — || March 14, 2004 || Socorro || LINEAR || THB || align=right | 5.3 km || 
|-id=508 bgcolor=#d6d6d6
| 240508 ||  || — || March 14, 2004 || Socorro || LINEAR || LIX || align=right | 5.0 km || 
|-id=509 bgcolor=#d6d6d6
| 240509 ||  || — || March 15, 2004 || Socorro || LINEAR || — || align=right | 4.8 km || 
|-id=510 bgcolor=#d6d6d6
| 240510 ||  || — || March 14, 2004 || Kitt Peak || Spacewatch || THM || align=right | 2.6 km || 
|-id=511 bgcolor=#d6d6d6
| 240511 ||  || — || March 15, 2004 || Socorro || LINEAR || — || align=right | 7.0 km || 
|-id=512 bgcolor=#d6d6d6
| 240512 ||  || — || March 15, 2004 || Kitt Peak || Spacewatch || — || align=right | 2.7 km || 
|-id=513 bgcolor=#d6d6d6
| 240513 ||  || — || March 15, 2004 || Kitt Peak || Spacewatch || — || align=right | 3.0 km || 
|-id=514 bgcolor=#d6d6d6
| 240514 ||  || — || March 19, 2004 || Modra || Modra Obs. || — || align=right | 5.8 km || 
|-id=515 bgcolor=#d6d6d6
| 240515 ||  || — || March 22, 2004 || Socorro || LINEAR || HYG || align=right | 3.3 km || 
|-id=516 bgcolor=#d6d6d6
| 240516 ||  || — || March 29, 2004 || Socorro || LINEAR || EUP || align=right | 5.5 km || 
|-id=517 bgcolor=#d6d6d6
| 240517 ||  || — || March 18, 2004 || Kitt Peak || Spacewatch || — || align=right | 4.1 km || 
|-id=518 bgcolor=#d6d6d6
| 240518 ||  || — || March 20, 2004 || Socorro || LINEAR || HYG || align=right | 4.2 km || 
|-id=519 bgcolor=#d6d6d6
| 240519 ||  || — || March 18, 2004 || Socorro || LINEAR || URS || align=right | 5.0 km || 
|-id=520 bgcolor=#d6d6d6
| 240520 ||  || — || March 20, 2004 || Socorro || LINEAR || — || align=right | 3.9 km || 
|-id=521 bgcolor=#d6d6d6
| 240521 ||  || — || March 18, 2004 || Socorro || LINEAR || THM || align=right | 2.4 km || 
|-id=522 bgcolor=#d6d6d6
| 240522 ||  || — || March 23, 2004 || Socorro || LINEAR || — || align=right | 4.1 km || 
|-id=523 bgcolor=#d6d6d6
| 240523 ||  || — || March 23, 2004 || Kitt Peak || Spacewatch || — || align=right | 2.6 km || 
|-id=524 bgcolor=#d6d6d6
| 240524 ||  || — || March 26, 2004 || Kitt Peak || Spacewatch || — || align=right | 3.7 km || 
|-id=525 bgcolor=#d6d6d6
| 240525 ||  || — || March 27, 2004 || Socorro || LINEAR || EUP || align=right | 4.5 km || 
|-id=526 bgcolor=#E9E9E9
| 240526 ||  || — || March 26, 2004 || Anderson Mesa || LONEOS || — || align=right | 3.4 km || 
|-id=527 bgcolor=#d6d6d6
| 240527 ||  || — || March 26, 2004 || Socorro || LINEAR || — || align=right | 4.3 km || 
|-id=528 bgcolor=#d6d6d6
| 240528 ||  || — || March 27, 2004 || Socorro || LINEAR || — || align=right | 3.3 km || 
|-id=529 bgcolor=#d6d6d6
| 240529 ||  || — || March 28, 2004 || Socorro || LINEAR || — || align=right | 3.5 km || 
|-id=530 bgcolor=#d6d6d6
| 240530 ||  || — || March 30, 2004 || Kitt Peak || Spacewatch || THM || align=right | 3.1 km || 
|-id=531 bgcolor=#d6d6d6
| 240531 ||  || — || March 29, 2004 || Socorro || LINEAR || EUP || align=right | 5.1 km || 
|-id=532 bgcolor=#d6d6d6
| 240532 ||  || — || March 29, 2004 || Socorro || LINEAR || — || align=right | 5.4 km || 
|-id=533 bgcolor=#d6d6d6
| 240533 ||  || — || March 18, 2004 || Socorro || LINEAR || VER || align=right | 3.9 km || 
|-id=534 bgcolor=#d6d6d6
| 240534 ||  || — || April 12, 2004 || Kitt Peak || Spacewatch || — || align=right | 2.9 km || 
|-id=535 bgcolor=#d6d6d6
| 240535 ||  || — || April 14, 2004 || Kitt Peak || Spacewatch || EOS || align=right | 2.8 km || 
|-id=536 bgcolor=#d6d6d6
| 240536 ||  || — || April 14, 2004 || Socorro || LINEAR || EUP || align=right | 4.1 km || 
|-id=537 bgcolor=#d6d6d6
| 240537 ||  || — || April 12, 2004 || Kitt Peak || Spacewatch || — || align=right | 4.9 km || 
|-id=538 bgcolor=#d6d6d6
| 240538 ||  || — || April 12, 2004 || Kitt Peak || Spacewatch || — || align=right | 3.4 km || 
|-id=539 bgcolor=#d6d6d6
| 240539 ||  || — || April 12, 2004 || Kitt Peak || Spacewatch || — || align=right | 4.7 km || 
|-id=540 bgcolor=#d6d6d6
| 240540 ||  || — || April 14, 2004 || Catalina || CSS || — || align=right | 4.3 km || 
|-id=541 bgcolor=#d6d6d6
| 240541 ||  || — || April 16, 2004 || Socorro || LINEAR || — || align=right | 3.7 km || 
|-id=542 bgcolor=#d6d6d6
| 240542 ||  || — || April 19, 2004 || Socorro || LINEAR || EUP || align=right | 6.9 km || 
|-id=543 bgcolor=#d6d6d6
| 240543 ||  || — || April 24, 2004 || Catalina || CSS || — || align=right | 4.8 km || 
|-id=544 bgcolor=#fefefe
| 240544 ||  || — || July 11, 2004 || Socorro || LINEAR || — || align=right | 1.1 km || 
|-id=545 bgcolor=#fefefe
| 240545 ||  || — || August 7, 2004 || Palomar || NEAT || NYS || align=right data-sort-value="0.93" | 930 m || 
|-id=546 bgcolor=#fefefe
| 240546 ||  || — || August 8, 2004 || Socorro || LINEAR || — || align=right data-sort-value="0.90" | 900 m || 
|-id=547 bgcolor=#fefefe
| 240547 ||  || — || August 11, 2004 || Socorro || LINEAR || — || align=right | 1.2 km || 
|-id=548 bgcolor=#fefefe
| 240548 ||  || — || August 22, 2004 || Siding Spring || SSS || — || align=right | 1.3 km || 
|-id=549 bgcolor=#E9E9E9
| 240549 ||  || — || September 5, 2004 || Palomar || NEAT || BRG || align=right | 2.2 km || 
|-id=550 bgcolor=#fefefe
| 240550 ||  || — || September 5, 2004 || Palomar || NEAT || FLO || align=right | 1.4 km || 
|-id=551 bgcolor=#fefefe
| 240551 ||  || — || September 7, 2004 || Socorro || LINEAR || — || align=right data-sort-value="0.99" | 990 m || 
|-id=552 bgcolor=#fefefe
| 240552 ||  || — || September 8, 2004 || Socorro || LINEAR || — || align=right | 1.7 km || 
|-id=553 bgcolor=#fefefe
| 240553 ||  || — || September 8, 2004 || Palomar || NEAT || V || align=right | 1.0 km || 
|-id=554 bgcolor=#fefefe
| 240554 ||  || — || September 9, 2004 || Socorro || LINEAR || FLO || align=right | 1.4 km || 
|-id=555 bgcolor=#fefefe
| 240555 ||  || — || September 9, 2004 || Socorro || LINEAR || — || align=right | 1.1 km || 
|-id=556 bgcolor=#fefefe
| 240556 ||  || — || September 8, 2004 || Wrightwood || J. W. Young || V || align=right | 1.1 km || 
|-id=557 bgcolor=#E9E9E9
| 240557 ||  || — || September 9, 2004 || Kitt Peak || Spacewatch || — || align=right | 1.3 km || 
|-id=558 bgcolor=#E9E9E9
| 240558 ||  || — || September 13, 2004 || Palomar || NEAT || — || align=right | 1.6 km || 
|-id=559 bgcolor=#fefefe
| 240559 ||  || — || September 15, 2004 || Socorro || LINEAR || PHO || align=right | 1.4 km || 
|-id=560 bgcolor=#fefefe
| 240560 ||  || — || September 8, 2004 || Socorro || LINEAR || — || align=right | 1.1 km || 
|-id=561 bgcolor=#fefefe
| 240561 ||  || — || September 15, 2004 || Kitt Peak || Spacewatch || V || align=right data-sort-value="0.89" | 890 m || 
|-id=562 bgcolor=#E9E9E9
| 240562 ||  || — || September 16, 2004 || Socorro || LINEAR || KON || align=right | 3.3 km || 
|-id=563 bgcolor=#fefefe
| 240563 ||  || — || September 16, 2004 || Kitt Peak || Spacewatch || NYS || align=right data-sort-value="0.91" | 910 m || 
|-id=564 bgcolor=#fefefe
| 240564 ||  || — || September 17, 2004 || Socorro || LINEAR || — || align=right | 2.1 km || 
|-id=565 bgcolor=#FA8072
| 240565 ||  || — || September 18, 2004 || Siding Spring || SSS || PHO || align=right | 1.5 km || 
|-id=566 bgcolor=#fefefe
| 240566 ||  || — || September 17, 2004 || Socorro || LINEAR || — || align=right | 1.1 km || 
|-id=567 bgcolor=#fefefe
| 240567 ||  || — || September 22, 2004 || Socorro || LINEAR || FLO || align=right data-sort-value="0.90" | 900 m || 
|-id=568 bgcolor=#fefefe
| 240568 ||  || — || September 17, 2004 || Socorro || LINEAR || NYS || align=right data-sort-value="0.84" | 840 m || 
|-id=569 bgcolor=#fefefe
| 240569 ||  || — || October 4, 2004 || Kitt Peak || Spacewatch || — || align=right data-sort-value="0.98" | 980 m || 
|-id=570 bgcolor=#FA8072
| 240570 ||  || — || October 7, 2004 || Socorro || LINEAR || — || align=right data-sort-value="0.94" | 940 m || 
|-id=571 bgcolor=#fefefe
| 240571 ||  || — || October 4, 2004 || Kitt Peak || Spacewatch || — || align=right | 1.1 km || 
|-id=572 bgcolor=#fefefe
| 240572 ||  || — || October 4, 2004 || Kitt Peak || Spacewatch || — || align=right | 1.4 km || 
|-id=573 bgcolor=#fefefe
| 240573 ||  || — || October 4, 2004 || Kitt Peak || Spacewatch || FLO || align=right data-sort-value="0.94" | 940 m || 
|-id=574 bgcolor=#fefefe
| 240574 ||  || — || October 4, 2004 || Kitt Peak || Spacewatch || NYS || align=right data-sort-value="0.89" | 890 m || 
|-id=575 bgcolor=#fefefe
| 240575 ||  || — || October 4, 2004 || Kitt Peak || Spacewatch || NYS || align=right data-sort-value="0.86" | 860 m || 
|-id=576 bgcolor=#E9E9E9
| 240576 ||  || — || October 5, 2004 || Anderson Mesa || LONEOS || — || align=right | 2.5 km || 
|-id=577 bgcolor=#fefefe
| 240577 ||  || — || October 6, 2004 || Kitt Peak || Spacewatch || — || align=right | 1.8 km || 
|-id=578 bgcolor=#fefefe
| 240578 ||  || — || October 6, 2004 || Kitt Peak || Spacewatch || FLO || align=right | 1.3 km || 
|-id=579 bgcolor=#fefefe
| 240579 ||  || — || October 6, 2004 || Kitt Peak || Spacewatch || FLO || align=right data-sort-value="0.84" | 840 m || 
|-id=580 bgcolor=#fefefe
| 240580 ||  || — || October 7, 2004 || Palomar || NEAT || V || align=right data-sort-value="0.78" | 780 m || 
|-id=581 bgcolor=#fefefe
| 240581 ||  || — || October 7, 2004 || Socorro || LINEAR || NYS || align=right data-sort-value="0.81" | 810 m || 
|-id=582 bgcolor=#fefefe
| 240582 ||  || — || October 7, 2004 || Socorro || LINEAR || V || align=right data-sort-value="0.94" | 940 m || 
|-id=583 bgcolor=#fefefe
| 240583 ||  || — || October 4, 2004 || Kitt Peak || Spacewatch || — || align=right | 1.1 km || 
|-id=584 bgcolor=#E9E9E9
| 240584 ||  || — || October 4, 2004 || Kitt Peak || Spacewatch || — || align=right | 3.3 km || 
|-id=585 bgcolor=#fefefe
| 240585 ||  || — || October 6, 2004 || Kitt Peak || Spacewatch || V || align=right data-sort-value="0.74" | 740 m || 
|-id=586 bgcolor=#fefefe
| 240586 ||  || — || October 6, 2004 || Kitt Peak || Spacewatch || FLO || align=right | 2.6 km || 
|-id=587 bgcolor=#E9E9E9
| 240587 ||  || — || October 6, 2004 || Kitt Peak || Spacewatch || — || align=right | 3.3 km || 
|-id=588 bgcolor=#fefefe
| 240588 ||  || — || October 7, 2004 || Socorro || LINEAR || NYS || align=right data-sort-value="0.94" | 940 m || 
|-id=589 bgcolor=#fefefe
| 240589 ||  || — || October 9, 2004 || Socorro || LINEAR || — || align=right | 1.1 km || 
|-id=590 bgcolor=#fefefe
| 240590 ||  || — || October 10, 2004 || Kitt Peak || Spacewatch || NYS || align=right data-sort-value="0.77" | 770 m || 
|-id=591 bgcolor=#fefefe
| 240591 ||  || — || October 7, 2004 || Palomar || NEAT || NYS || align=right data-sort-value="0.99" | 990 m || 
|-id=592 bgcolor=#fefefe
| 240592 ||  || — || October 9, 2004 || Kitt Peak || Spacewatch || — || align=right | 2.0 km || 
|-id=593 bgcolor=#fefefe
| 240593 ||  || — || October 9, 2004 || Kitt Peak || Spacewatch || V || align=right | 1.0 km || 
|-id=594 bgcolor=#fefefe
| 240594 ||  || — || October 10, 2004 || Kitt Peak || Spacewatch || — || align=right data-sort-value="0.85" | 850 m || 
|-id=595 bgcolor=#fefefe
| 240595 ||  || — || October 9, 2004 || Socorro || LINEAR || — || align=right | 1.3 km || 
|-id=596 bgcolor=#E9E9E9
| 240596 ||  || — || October 18, 2004 || Socorro || LINEAR || PAL || align=right | 2.9 km || 
|-id=597 bgcolor=#fefefe
| 240597 ||  || — || November 3, 2004 || Kitt Peak || Spacewatch || — || align=right | 1.1 km || 
|-id=598 bgcolor=#E9E9E9
| 240598 ||  || — || November 3, 2004 || Anderson Mesa || LONEOS || — || align=right | 3.2 km || 
|-id=599 bgcolor=#fefefe
| 240599 ||  || — || November 4, 2004 || Kitt Peak || Spacewatch || — || align=right | 1.6 km || 
|-id=600 bgcolor=#E9E9E9
| 240600 ||  || — || November 4, 2004 || Catalina || CSS || — || align=right | 3.1 km || 
|}

240601–240700 

|-bgcolor=#fefefe
| 240601 ||  || — || November 4, 2004 || Catalina || CSS || NYS || align=right data-sort-value="0.81" | 810 m || 
|-id=602 bgcolor=#fefefe
| 240602 ||  || — || November 3, 2004 || Kitt Peak || Spacewatch || V || align=right data-sort-value="0.92" | 920 m || 
|-id=603 bgcolor=#fefefe
| 240603 ||  || — || November 4, 2004 || Kitt Peak || Spacewatch || FLO || align=right data-sort-value="0.90" | 900 m || 
|-id=604 bgcolor=#E9E9E9
| 240604 ||  || — || November 4, 2004 || Kitt Peak || Spacewatch || — || align=right | 1.3 km || 
|-id=605 bgcolor=#fefefe
| 240605 ||  || — || November 7, 2004 || Socorro || LINEAR || NYS || align=right | 1.0 km || 
|-id=606 bgcolor=#fefefe
| 240606 ||  || — || November 12, 2004 || Catalina || CSS || — || align=right | 1.1 km || 
|-id=607 bgcolor=#E9E9E9
| 240607 ||  || — || November 3, 2004 || Palomar || NEAT || — || align=right | 1.6 km || 
|-id=608 bgcolor=#E9E9E9
| 240608 ||  || — || November 19, 2004 || Anderson Mesa || LONEOS || — || align=right | 3.4 km || 
|-id=609 bgcolor=#E9E9E9
| 240609 ||  || — || December 2, 2004 || Socorro || LINEAR || — || align=right | 1.4 km || 
|-id=610 bgcolor=#E9E9E9
| 240610 ||  || — || December 2, 2004 || Socorro || LINEAR || MIT || align=right | 3.6 km || 
|-id=611 bgcolor=#E9E9E9
| 240611 ||  || — || December 9, 2004 || Socorro || LINEAR || GEF || align=right | 2.2 km || 
|-id=612 bgcolor=#E9E9E9
| 240612 ||  || — || December 9, 2004 || Catalina || CSS || — || align=right | 2.1 km || 
|-id=613 bgcolor=#E9E9E9
| 240613 ||  || — || December 11, 2004 || Campo Imperatore || CINEOS || — || align=right | 1.8 km || 
|-id=614 bgcolor=#fefefe
| 240614 ||  || — || December 9, 2004 || Catalina || CSS || — || align=right | 1.2 km || 
|-id=615 bgcolor=#E9E9E9
| 240615 ||  || — || December 13, 2004 || Junk Bond || Junk Bond Obs. || — || align=right | 1.3 km || 
|-id=616 bgcolor=#E9E9E9
| 240616 ||  || — || December 14, 2004 || Campo Imperatore || CINEOS || — || align=right | 4.0 km || 
|-id=617 bgcolor=#fefefe
| 240617 ||  || — || December 2, 2004 || Catalina || CSS || NYS || align=right data-sort-value="0.88" | 880 m || 
|-id=618 bgcolor=#E9E9E9
| 240618 ||  || — || December 11, 2004 || Kitt Peak || Spacewatch || — || align=right | 1.4 km || 
|-id=619 bgcolor=#fefefe
| 240619 ||  || — || December 10, 2004 || Socorro || LINEAR || — || align=right | 1.2 km || 
|-id=620 bgcolor=#fefefe
| 240620 ||  || — || December 11, 2004 || Socorro || LINEAR || — || align=right | 1.0 km || 
|-id=621 bgcolor=#E9E9E9
| 240621 ||  || — || December 14, 2004 || Socorro || LINEAR || — || align=right | 4.3 km || 
|-id=622 bgcolor=#E9E9E9
| 240622 ||  || — || December 11, 2004 || Socorro || LINEAR || — || align=right | 3.3 km || 
|-id=623 bgcolor=#E9E9E9
| 240623 ||  || — || December 15, 2004 || Socorro || LINEAR || — || align=right | 3.8 km || 
|-id=624 bgcolor=#E9E9E9
| 240624 ||  || — || December 11, 2004 || Catalina || CSS || — || align=right | 3.6 km || 
|-id=625 bgcolor=#E9E9E9
| 240625 ||  || — || December 15, 2004 || Socorro || LINEAR || — || align=right | 1.9 km || 
|-id=626 bgcolor=#E9E9E9
| 240626 ||  || — || December 15, 2004 || Kitt Peak || Spacewatch || — || align=right | 1.5 km || 
|-id=627 bgcolor=#E9E9E9
| 240627 ||  || — || December 12, 2004 || Kitt Peak || Spacewatch || — || align=right | 2.2 km || 
|-id=628 bgcolor=#E9E9E9
| 240628 ||  || — || December 17, 2004 || Socorro || LINEAR || BAR || align=right | 1.9 km || 
|-id=629 bgcolor=#E9E9E9
| 240629 || 2004 YS || — || December 16, 2004 || Junk Bond || D. Healy || MIS || align=right | 2.4 km || 
|-id=630 bgcolor=#d6d6d6
| 240630 ||  || — || December 18, 2004 || Mount Lemmon || Mount Lemmon Survey || — || align=right | 3.7 km || 
|-id=631 bgcolor=#E9E9E9
| 240631 ||  || — || December 18, 2004 || Socorro || LINEAR || — || align=right | 2.4 km || 
|-id=632 bgcolor=#E9E9E9
| 240632 ||  || — || January 8, 2005 || Needville || J. Dellinger || DOR || align=right | 3.8 km || 
|-id=633 bgcolor=#E9E9E9
| 240633 ||  || — || January 6, 2005 || Socorro || LINEAR || — || align=right | 4.1 km || 
|-id=634 bgcolor=#E9E9E9
| 240634 ||  || — || January 6, 2005 || Catalina || CSS || — || align=right | 2.1 km || 
|-id=635 bgcolor=#fefefe
| 240635 ||  || — || January 13, 2005 || Kitt Peak || Spacewatch || NYS || align=right | 1.1 km || 
|-id=636 bgcolor=#E9E9E9
| 240636 ||  || — || January 13, 2005 || Kitt Peak || Spacewatch || — || align=right | 1.1 km || 
|-id=637 bgcolor=#E9E9E9
| 240637 ||  || — || January 13, 2005 || Socorro || LINEAR || — || align=right | 1.8 km || 
|-id=638 bgcolor=#E9E9E9
| 240638 ||  || — || January 15, 2005 || Socorro || LINEAR || MIS || align=right | 2.9 km || 
|-id=639 bgcolor=#E9E9E9
| 240639 ||  || — || January 15, 2005 || Kitt Peak || Spacewatch || — || align=right | 3.2 km || 
|-id=640 bgcolor=#E9E9E9
| 240640 ||  || — || January 13, 2005 || Kitt Peak || Spacewatch || ADE || align=right | 3.6 km || 
|-id=641 bgcolor=#E9E9E9
| 240641 ||  || — || January 15, 2005 || Socorro || LINEAR || — || align=right | 2.0 km || 
|-id=642 bgcolor=#d6d6d6
| 240642 ||  || — || January 15, 2005 || Catalina || CSS || — || align=right | 3.7 km || 
|-id=643 bgcolor=#E9E9E9
| 240643 ||  || — || January 16, 2005 || Socorro || LINEAR || — || align=right | 1.9 km || 
|-id=644 bgcolor=#E9E9E9
| 240644 ||  || — || January 16, 2005 || Socorro || LINEAR || — || align=right | 1.6 km || 
|-id=645 bgcolor=#E9E9E9
| 240645 ||  || — || January 16, 2005 || Kitt Peak || Spacewatch || EUN || align=right | 2.0 km || 
|-id=646 bgcolor=#E9E9E9
| 240646 ||  || — || January 19, 2005 || Socorro || LINEAR || — || align=right | 1.8 km || 
|-id=647 bgcolor=#E9E9E9
| 240647 ||  || — || January 19, 2005 || Kitt Peak || Spacewatch || EUN || align=right | 1.9 km || 
|-id=648 bgcolor=#E9E9E9
| 240648 ||  || — || January 16, 2005 || Catalina || CSS || — || align=right | 3.1 km || 
|-id=649 bgcolor=#E9E9E9
| 240649 ||  || — || February 1, 2005 || Catalina || CSS || EUN || align=right | 2.2 km || 
|-id=650 bgcolor=#E9E9E9
| 240650 ||  || — || February 1, 2005 || Catalina || CSS || — || align=right | 2.4 km || 
|-id=651 bgcolor=#E9E9E9
| 240651 ||  || — || February 2, 2005 || Kitt Peak || Spacewatch || — || align=right | 2.4 km || 
|-id=652 bgcolor=#E9E9E9
| 240652 ||  || — || February 2, 2005 || Catalina || CSS || — || align=right | 2.2 km || 
|-id=653 bgcolor=#E9E9E9
| 240653 ||  || — || February 2, 2005 || Socorro || LINEAR || — || align=right | 1.6 km || 
|-id=654 bgcolor=#E9E9E9
| 240654 ||  || — || February 3, 2005 || Socorro || LINEAR || HNS || align=right | 1.7 km || 
|-id=655 bgcolor=#d6d6d6
| 240655 ||  || — || February 2, 2005 || Kitt Peak || Spacewatch || EOS || align=right | 3.3 km || 
|-id=656 bgcolor=#E9E9E9
| 240656 ||  || — || February 2, 2005 || Catalina || CSS || — || align=right | 4.1 km || 
|-id=657 bgcolor=#E9E9E9
| 240657 ||  || — || February 2, 2005 || Catalina || CSS || — || align=right | 3.5 km || 
|-id=658 bgcolor=#E9E9E9
| 240658 ||  || — || March 1, 2005 || Kitt Peak || Spacewatch || — || align=right | 2.5 km || 
|-id=659 bgcolor=#E9E9E9
| 240659 ||  || — || March 3, 2005 || Catalina || CSS || — || align=right | 2.2 km || 
|-id=660 bgcolor=#E9E9E9
| 240660 ||  || — || March 3, 2005 || Catalina || CSS || HNA || align=right | 2.9 km || 
|-id=661 bgcolor=#E9E9E9
| 240661 ||  || — || March 3, 2005 || Catalina || CSS || MIT || align=right | 2.3 km || 
|-id=662 bgcolor=#fefefe
| 240662 ||  || — || March 1, 2005 || Goodricke-Pigott || R. A. Tucker || — || align=right | 2.7 km || 
|-id=663 bgcolor=#E9E9E9
| 240663 ||  || — || March 3, 2005 || Catalina || CSS || ADE || align=right | 2.7 km || 
|-id=664 bgcolor=#E9E9E9
| 240664 ||  || — || March 3, 2005 || Catalina || CSS || CLO || align=right | 4.9 km || 
|-id=665 bgcolor=#E9E9E9
| 240665 ||  || — || March 3, 2005 || Catalina || CSS || — || align=right | 2.4 km || 
|-id=666 bgcolor=#E9E9E9
| 240666 ||  || — || March 7, 2005 || Socorro || LINEAR || DOR || align=right | 2.4 km || 
|-id=667 bgcolor=#E9E9E9
| 240667 ||  || — || March 3, 2005 || Kitt Peak || Spacewatch || — || align=right | 2.4 km || 
|-id=668 bgcolor=#E9E9E9
| 240668 ||  || — || March 3, 2005 || Kitt Peak || Spacewatch || — || align=right | 3.3 km || 
|-id=669 bgcolor=#E9E9E9
| 240669 ||  || — || March 4, 2005 || Kitt Peak || Spacewatch || — || align=right | 3.7 km || 
|-id=670 bgcolor=#E9E9E9
| 240670 ||  || — || March 8, 2005 || Anderson Mesa || LONEOS || VIB || align=right | 2.5 km || 
|-id=671 bgcolor=#E9E9E9
| 240671 ||  || — || March 8, 2005 || Kitt Peak || Spacewatch || — || align=right | 2.3 km || 
|-id=672 bgcolor=#E9E9E9
| 240672 ||  || — || March 8, 2005 || Socorro || LINEAR || — || align=right | 3.2 km || 
|-id=673 bgcolor=#E9E9E9
| 240673 ||  || — || March 3, 2005 || Catalina || CSS || AER || align=right | 1.7 km || 
|-id=674 bgcolor=#E9E9E9
| 240674 ||  || — || March 3, 2005 || Catalina || CSS || CLO || align=right | 3.1 km || 
|-id=675 bgcolor=#E9E9E9
| 240675 ||  || — || March 8, 2005 || Goodricke-Pigott || R. A. Tucker || JUN || align=right | 1.4 km || 
|-id=676 bgcolor=#E9E9E9
| 240676 ||  || — || March 8, 2005 || Goodricke-Pigott || R. A. Tucker || HNS || align=right | 1.7 km || 
|-id=677 bgcolor=#E9E9E9
| 240677 ||  || — || March 8, 2005 || Socorro || LINEAR || — || align=right | 3.2 km || 
|-id=678 bgcolor=#E9E9E9
| 240678 ||  || — || March 8, 2005 || Catalina || CSS || — || align=right | 4.0 km || 
|-id=679 bgcolor=#E9E9E9
| 240679 ||  || — || March 8, 2005 || Socorro || LINEAR || — || align=right | 3.8 km || 
|-id=680 bgcolor=#E9E9E9
| 240680 ||  || — || March 9, 2005 || Mount Lemmon || Mount Lemmon Survey || — || align=right | 2.1 km || 
|-id=681 bgcolor=#E9E9E9
| 240681 ||  || — || March 9, 2005 || Catalina || CSS || GEF || align=right | 1.9 km || 
|-id=682 bgcolor=#d6d6d6
| 240682 ||  || — || March 9, 2005 || Socorro || LINEAR || EOS || align=right | 3.0 km || 
|-id=683 bgcolor=#d6d6d6
| 240683 ||  || — || March 10, 2005 || Kitt Peak || Spacewatch || VER || align=right | 4.4 km || 
|-id=684 bgcolor=#E9E9E9
| 240684 ||  || — || March 10, 2005 || Kitt Peak || Spacewatch || AGN || align=right | 1.5 km || 
|-id=685 bgcolor=#E9E9E9
| 240685 ||  || — || March 3, 2005 || Kitt Peak || Spacewatch || INO || align=right | 2.1 km || 
|-id=686 bgcolor=#d6d6d6
| 240686 ||  || — || March 10, 2005 || Mount Lemmon || Mount Lemmon Survey || EOS || align=right | 2.3 km || 
|-id=687 bgcolor=#d6d6d6
| 240687 ||  || — || March 11, 2005 || Mount Lemmon || Mount Lemmon Survey || KAR || align=right | 1.1 km || 
|-id=688 bgcolor=#E9E9E9
| 240688 ||  || — || March 4, 2005 || Kitt Peak || Spacewatch || — || align=right | 2.9 km || 
|-id=689 bgcolor=#d6d6d6
| 240689 ||  || — || March 10, 2005 || Mount Lemmon || Mount Lemmon Survey || HYG || align=right | 3.2 km || 
|-id=690 bgcolor=#E9E9E9
| 240690 ||  || — || March 8, 2005 || Socorro || LINEAR || — || align=right | 4.0 km || 
|-id=691 bgcolor=#E9E9E9
| 240691 ||  || — || March 10, 2005 || Mount Lemmon || Mount Lemmon Survey || — || align=right | 2.9 km || 
|-id=692 bgcolor=#d6d6d6
| 240692 ||  || — || March 11, 2005 || Kitt Peak || Spacewatch || KOR || align=right | 1.8 km || 
|-id=693 bgcolor=#d6d6d6
| 240693 ||  || — || March 10, 2005 || Catalina || CSS || — || align=right | 3.3 km || 
|-id=694 bgcolor=#E9E9E9
| 240694 ||  || — || March 9, 2005 || Catalina || CSS || — || align=right | 5.2 km || 
|-id=695 bgcolor=#d6d6d6
| 240695 ||  || — || March 4, 2005 || Catalina || CSS || — || align=right | 4.2 km || 
|-id=696 bgcolor=#d6d6d6
| 240696 ||  || — || March 17, 2005 || Catalina || CSS || — || align=right | 7.0 km || 
|-id=697 bgcolor=#E9E9E9
| 240697 Gemenc || 2005 GC ||  || April 1, 2005 || Piszkéstető || K. Sárneczky || — || align=right | 3.3 km || 
|-id=698 bgcolor=#E9E9E9
| 240698 ||  || — || April 1, 2005 || Anderson Mesa || LONEOS || — || align=right | 2.1 km || 
|-id=699 bgcolor=#E9E9E9
| 240699 ||  || — || April 2, 2005 || Mount Lemmon || Mount Lemmon Survey || — || align=right | 2.2 km || 
|-id=700 bgcolor=#E9E9E9
| 240700 ||  || — || April 4, 2005 || Kitt Peak || Spacewatch || GER || align=right | 2.2 km || 
|}

240701–240800 

|-bgcolor=#E9E9E9
| 240701 ||  || — || April 4, 2005 || Mount Lemmon || Mount Lemmon Survey || — || align=right | 2.6 km || 
|-id=702 bgcolor=#d6d6d6
| 240702 ||  || — || April 4, 2005 || Catalina || CSS || — || align=right | 3.1 km || 
|-id=703 bgcolor=#d6d6d6
| 240703 ||  || — || April 5, 2005 || Mount Lemmon || Mount Lemmon Survey || KOR || align=right | 1.9 km || 
|-id=704 bgcolor=#d6d6d6
| 240704 ||  || — || April 5, 2005 || Mount Lemmon || Mount Lemmon Survey || KOR || align=right | 1.4 km || 
|-id=705 bgcolor=#d6d6d6
| 240705 ||  || — || April 8, 2005 || Great Shefford || Great Shefford Obs. || — || align=right | 5.6 km || 
|-id=706 bgcolor=#E9E9E9
| 240706 ||  || — || April 2, 2005 || Kitt Peak || Spacewatch || AGN || align=right | 1.6 km || 
|-id=707 bgcolor=#d6d6d6
| 240707 ||  || — || April 6, 2005 || Catalina || CSS || — || align=right | 2.7 km || 
|-id=708 bgcolor=#E9E9E9
| 240708 ||  || — || April 6, 2005 || Catalina || CSS || MAR || align=right | 2.2 km || 
|-id=709 bgcolor=#d6d6d6
| 240709 ||  || — || April 6, 2005 || Catalina || CSS || — || align=right | 4.5 km || 
|-id=710 bgcolor=#E9E9E9
| 240710 ||  || — || April 5, 2005 || Kitt Peak || Spacewatch || — || align=right | 1.9 km || 
|-id=711 bgcolor=#d6d6d6
| 240711 ||  || — || April 9, 2005 || Catalina || CSS || EUP || align=right | 5.3 km || 
|-id=712 bgcolor=#d6d6d6
| 240712 ||  || — || April 10, 2005 || Mount Lemmon || Mount Lemmon Survey || K-2 || align=right | 1.6 km || 
|-id=713 bgcolor=#d6d6d6
| 240713 ||  || — || April 10, 2005 || Mount Lemmon || Mount Lemmon Survey || KOR || align=right | 1.9 km || 
|-id=714 bgcolor=#d6d6d6
| 240714 ||  || — || April 5, 2005 || Mount Lemmon || Mount Lemmon Survey || HYG || align=right | 4.0 km || 
|-id=715 bgcolor=#E9E9E9
| 240715 ||  || — || April 9, 2005 || Mount Lemmon || Mount Lemmon Survey || HOF || align=right | 3.9 km || 
|-id=716 bgcolor=#d6d6d6
| 240716 ||  || — || April 11, 2005 || Kitt Peak || Spacewatch || — || align=right | 3.6 km || 
|-id=717 bgcolor=#d6d6d6
| 240717 ||  || — || April 11, 2005 || Mount Lemmon || Mount Lemmon Survey || — || align=right | 3.4 km || 
|-id=718 bgcolor=#d6d6d6
| 240718 ||  || — || April 10, 2005 || Mount Lemmon || Mount Lemmon Survey || — || align=right | 3.1 km || 
|-id=719 bgcolor=#d6d6d6
| 240719 ||  || — || April 7, 2005 || Kitt Peak || Spacewatch || — || align=right | 3.0 km || 
|-id=720 bgcolor=#E9E9E9
| 240720 ||  || — || April 10, 2005 || Kitt Peak || Spacewatch || — || align=right | 2.8 km || 
|-id=721 bgcolor=#d6d6d6
| 240721 ||  || — || April 11, 2005 || Kitt Peak || Spacewatch || — || align=right | 2.6 km || 
|-id=722 bgcolor=#d6d6d6
| 240722 ||  || — || April 12, 2005 || Socorro || LINEAR || — || align=right | 4.9 km || 
|-id=723 bgcolor=#d6d6d6
| 240723 ||  || — || April 13, 2005 || Socorro || LINEAR || HYG || align=right | 3.3 km || 
|-id=724 bgcolor=#E9E9E9
| 240724 ||  || — || April 14, 2005 || Kitt Peak || Spacewatch || AGN || align=right | 1.7 km || 
|-id=725 bgcolor=#d6d6d6
| 240725 ||  || — || April 12, 2005 || Kitt Peak || M. W. Buie || — || align=right | 3.1 km || 
|-id=726 bgcolor=#d6d6d6
| 240726 ||  || — || April 4, 2005 || Mount Lemmon || Mount Lemmon Survey || — || align=right | 4.4 km || 
|-id=727 bgcolor=#d6d6d6
| 240727 ||  || — || April 1, 2005 || Kitt Peak || Spacewatch || — || align=right | 3.1 km || 
|-id=728 bgcolor=#d6d6d6
| 240728 ||  || — || April 2, 2005 || Kitt Peak || Spacewatch || — || align=right | 3.5 km || 
|-id=729 bgcolor=#E9E9E9
| 240729 ||  || — || April 10, 2005 || Kitt Peak || Spacewatch || — || align=right | 3.7 km || 
|-id=730 bgcolor=#d6d6d6
| 240730 ||  || — || May 1, 2005 || Siding Spring || SSS || — || align=right | 4.5 km || 
|-id=731 bgcolor=#fefefe
| 240731 ||  || — || May 3, 2005 || Catalina || CSS || H || align=right data-sort-value="0.80" | 800 m || 
|-id=732 bgcolor=#d6d6d6
| 240732 ||  || — || May 3, 2005 || Kitt Peak || Spacewatch || EOS || align=right | 3.7 km || 
|-id=733 bgcolor=#d6d6d6
| 240733 ||  || — || May 4, 2005 || Kitt Peak || Spacewatch || — || align=right | 4.6 km || 
|-id=734 bgcolor=#E9E9E9
| 240734 ||  || — || May 8, 2005 || Mount Lemmon || Mount Lemmon Survey || — || align=right | 1.9 km || 
|-id=735 bgcolor=#d6d6d6
| 240735 ||  || — || May 8, 2005 || Kitt Peak || Spacewatch || — || align=right | 3.4 km || 
|-id=736 bgcolor=#d6d6d6
| 240736 ||  || — || May 8, 2005 || Anderson Mesa || LONEOS || — || align=right | 3.4 km || 
|-id=737 bgcolor=#d6d6d6
| 240737 ||  || — || May 9, 2005 || Mount Lemmon || Mount Lemmon Survey || EOS || align=right | 2.1 km || 
|-id=738 bgcolor=#fefefe
| 240738 ||  || — || May 8, 2005 || Kitt Peak || Spacewatch || H || align=right data-sort-value="0.94" | 940 m || 
|-id=739 bgcolor=#d6d6d6
| 240739 ||  || — || May 10, 2005 || Kitt Peak || Spacewatch || LUT || align=right | 5.6 km || 
|-id=740 bgcolor=#d6d6d6
| 240740 ||  || — || May 11, 2005 || Cordell-Lorenz || D. T. Durig || — || align=right | 3.2 km || 
|-id=741 bgcolor=#d6d6d6
| 240741 ||  || — || May 11, 2005 || Mount Lemmon || Mount Lemmon Survey || — || align=right | 4.0 km || 
|-id=742 bgcolor=#d6d6d6
| 240742 ||  || — || May 11, 2005 || Mount Lemmon || Mount Lemmon Survey || KOR || align=right | 2.1 km || 
|-id=743 bgcolor=#E9E9E9
| 240743 ||  || — || May 8, 2005 || Mount Lemmon || Mount Lemmon Survey || — || align=right | 2.4 km || 
|-id=744 bgcolor=#d6d6d6
| 240744 ||  || — || May 9, 2005 || Kitt Peak || Spacewatch || — || align=right | 4.0 km || 
|-id=745 bgcolor=#d6d6d6
| 240745 ||  || — || May 12, 2005 || Kitt Peak || Spacewatch || — || align=right | 2.6 km || 
|-id=746 bgcolor=#d6d6d6
| 240746 ||  || — || May 10, 2005 || Kitt Peak || Spacewatch || — || align=right | 2.8 km || 
|-id=747 bgcolor=#d6d6d6
| 240747 ||  || — || May 10, 2005 || Kitt Peak || Spacewatch || HYG || align=right | 3.4 km || 
|-id=748 bgcolor=#d6d6d6
| 240748 ||  || — || May 12, 2005 || Socorro || LINEAR || — || align=right | 4.3 km || 
|-id=749 bgcolor=#d6d6d6
| 240749 ||  || — || May 13, 2005 || Kitt Peak || Spacewatch || — || align=right | 3.6 km || 
|-id=750 bgcolor=#d6d6d6
| 240750 ||  || — || May 13, 2005 || Kitt Peak || Spacewatch || — || align=right | 3.5 km || 
|-id=751 bgcolor=#d6d6d6
| 240751 ||  || — || May 14, 2005 || Kitt Peak || Spacewatch || — || align=right | 3.3 km || 
|-id=752 bgcolor=#E9E9E9
| 240752 ||  || — || May 4, 2005 || Mount Lemmon || Mount Lemmon Survey || — || align=right | 3.2 km || 
|-id=753 bgcolor=#d6d6d6
| 240753 ||  || — || May 8, 2005 || Kitt Peak || Spacewatch || — || align=right | 3.8 km || 
|-id=754 bgcolor=#d6d6d6
| 240754 ||  || — || May 9, 2005 || Catalina || CSS || ALA || align=right | 6.0 km || 
|-id=755 bgcolor=#d6d6d6
| 240755 ||  || — || May 10, 2005 || Mount Lemmon || Mount Lemmon Survey || EOS || align=right | 2.6 km || 
|-id=756 bgcolor=#E9E9E9
| 240756 ||  || — || May 16, 2005 || Socorro || LINEAR || — || align=right | 3.0 km || 
|-id=757 bgcolor=#d6d6d6
| 240757 Farkasberci ||  ||  || May 26, 2005 || Piszkéstető || K. Sárneczky || — || align=right | 3.4 km || 
|-id=758 bgcolor=#d6d6d6
| 240758 ||  || — || June 1, 2005 || Kitt Peak || Spacewatch || — || align=right | 2.7 km || 
|-id=759 bgcolor=#d6d6d6
| 240759 ||  || — || June 5, 2005 || Kitt Peak || Spacewatch || — || align=right | 5.7 km || 
|-id=760 bgcolor=#d6d6d6
| 240760 ||  || — || June 8, 2005 || Kitt Peak || Spacewatch || TEL || align=right | 1.8 km || 
|-id=761 bgcolor=#d6d6d6
| 240761 ||  || — || June 4, 2005 || Kitt Peak || Spacewatch || — || align=right | 3.3 km || 
|-id=762 bgcolor=#d6d6d6
| 240762 ||  || — || June 13, 2005 || Kitt Peak || Spacewatch || — || align=right | 5.6 km || 
|-id=763 bgcolor=#d6d6d6
| 240763 ||  || — || June 11, 2005 || Kitt Peak || Spacewatch || 7:4 || align=right | 5.5 km || 
|-id=764 bgcolor=#d6d6d6
| 240764 ||  || — || June 13, 2005 || Mount Lemmon || Mount Lemmon Survey || HYG || align=right | 3.6 km || 
|-id=765 bgcolor=#d6d6d6
| 240765 ||  || — || June 29, 2005 || Catalina || CSS || EUP || align=right | 5.2 km || 
|-id=766 bgcolor=#d6d6d6
| 240766 ||  || — || July 3, 2005 || Siding Spring || SSS || — || align=right | 4.2 km || 
|-id=767 bgcolor=#d6d6d6
| 240767 ||  || — || July 4, 2005 || Kitt Peak || Spacewatch || THM || align=right | 3.1 km || 
|-id=768 bgcolor=#d6d6d6
| 240768 ||  || — || July 17, 2005 || Siding Spring || SSS || THB || align=right | 6.4 km || 
|-id=769 bgcolor=#d6d6d6
| 240769 ||  || — || July 27, 2005 || Siding Spring || SSS || — || align=right | 3.5 km || 
|-id=770 bgcolor=#fefefe
| 240770 ||  || — || July 29, 2005 || Socorro || LINEAR || H || align=right data-sort-value="0.75" | 750 m || 
|-id=771 bgcolor=#d6d6d6
| 240771 ||  || — || August 12, 2005 || Pla D'Arguines || R. Ferrando, M. Ferrando || HYG || align=right | 4.3 km || 
|-id=772 bgcolor=#d6d6d6
| 240772 ||  || — || August 28, 2005 || Siding Spring || SSS || — || align=right | 5.1 km || 
|-id=773 bgcolor=#d6d6d6
| 240773 ||  || — || August 29, 2005 || Kitt Peak || Spacewatch || — || align=right | 3.7 km || 
|-id=774 bgcolor=#d6d6d6
| 240774 ||  || — || September 14, 2005 || Catalina || CSS || LIX || align=right | 5.1 km || 
|-id=775 bgcolor=#d6d6d6
| 240775 ||  || — || September 24, 2005 || Kitt Peak || Spacewatch || THM || align=right | 3.6 km || 
|-id=776 bgcolor=#d6d6d6
| 240776 ||  || — || September 24, 2005 || Kitt Peak || Spacewatch || HYG || align=right | 3.0 km || 
|-id=777 bgcolor=#d6d6d6
| 240777 ||  || — || September 25, 2005 || Kitt Peak || Spacewatch || — || align=right | 3.4 km || 
|-id=778 bgcolor=#d6d6d6
| 240778 ||  || — || September 25, 2005 || Kitt Peak || Spacewatch || — || align=right | 3.9 km || 
|-id=779 bgcolor=#d6d6d6
| 240779 ||  || — || September 29, 2005 || Anderson Mesa || LONEOS || — || align=right | 2.4 km || 
|-id=780 bgcolor=#d6d6d6
| 240780 ||  || — || September 29, 2005 || Catalina || CSS || TIR || align=right | 3.3 km || 
|-id=781 bgcolor=#d6d6d6
| 240781 ||  || — || September 26, 2005 || Kitt Peak || Spacewatch || — || align=right | 5.9 km || 
|-id=782 bgcolor=#fefefe
| 240782 ||  || — || September 30, 2005 || Mount Lemmon || Mount Lemmon Survey || — || align=right | 1.2 km || 
|-id=783 bgcolor=#d6d6d6
| 240783 ||  || — || October 7, 2005 || Catalina || CSS || — || align=right | 5.5 km || 
|-id=784 bgcolor=#d6d6d6
| 240784 ||  || — || October 7, 2005 || Socorro || LINEAR || LIX || align=right | 5.2 km || 
|-id=785 bgcolor=#d6d6d6
| 240785 ||  || — || October 10, 2005 || Catalina || CSS || — || align=right | 4.8 km || 
|-id=786 bgcolor=#fefefe
| 240786 ||  || — || October 24, 2005 || Kitt Peak || Spacewatch || FLO || align=right data-sort-value="0.66" | 660 m || 
|-id=787 bgcolor=#d6d6d6
| 240787 ||  || — || October 20, 2005 || Mount Lemmon || Mount Lemmon Survey || — || align=right | 5.7 km || 
|-id=788 bgcolor=#fefefe
| 240788 ||  || — || October 22, 2005 || Kitt Peak || Spacewatch || — || align=right | 1.0 km || 
|-id=789 bgcolor=#d6d6d6
| 240789 ||  || — || October 28, 2005 || Junk Bond || D. Healy || — || align=right | 6.2 km || 
|-id=790 bgcolor=#fefefe
| 240790 ||  || — || October 24, 2005 || Mauna Kea || D. J. Tholen || NYS || align=right data-sort-value="0.89" | 890 m || 
|-id=791 bgcolor=#fefefe
| 240791 ||  || — || November 4, 2005 || Kitt Peak || Spacewatch || V || align=right data-sort-value="0.92" | 920 m || 
|-id=792 bgcolor=#fefefe
| 240792 ||  || — || November 1, 2005 || Mount Lemmon || Mount Lemmon Survey || — || align=right | 1.3 km || 
|-id=793 bgcolor=#fefefe
| 240793 ||  || — || November 5, 2005 || Kitt Peak || Spacewatch || — || align=right | 1.6 km || 
|-id=794 bgcolor=#fefefe
| 240794 ||  || — || November 28, 2005 || Mount Lemmon || Mount Lemmon Survey || — || align=right | 2.0 km || 
|-id=795 bgcolor=#fefefe
| 240795 ||  || — || November 26, 2005 || Kitt Peak || Spacewatch || NYS || align=right data-sort-value="0.90" | 900 m || 
|-id=796 bgcolor=#fefefe
| 240796 ||  || — || November 28, 2005 || Kitt Peak || Spacewatch || V || align=right data-sort-value="0.95" | 950 m || 
|-id=797 bgcolor=#fefefe
| 240797 ||  || — || December 4, 2005 || Kitt Peak || Spacewatch || — || align=right | 2.0 km || 
|-id=798 bgcolor=#fefefe
| 240798 ||  || — || December 4, 2005 || Kitt Peak || Spacewatch || — || align=right data-sort-value="0.84" | 840 m || 
|-id=799 bgcolor=#fefefe
| 240799 ||  || — || December 8, 2005 || Kitt Peak || Spacewatch || FLO || align=right data-sort-value="0.79" | 790 m || 
|-id=800 bgcolor=#fefefe
| 240800 ||  || — || December 22, 2005 || Kitt Peak || Spacewatch || — || align=right | 1.1 km || 
|}

240801–240900 

|-bgcolor=#fefefe
| 240801 ||  || — || December 24, 2005 || Kitt Peak || Spacewatch || — || align=right data-sort-value="0.71" | 710 m || 
|-id=802 bgcolor=#fefefe
| 240802 ||  || — || December 27, 2005 || Mount Lemmon || Mount Lemmon Survey || — || align=right | 1.1 km || 
|-id=803 bgcolor=#fefefe
| 240803 ||  || — || December 26, 2005 || Mount Lemmon || Mount Lemmon Survey || SUL || align=right | 3.3 km || 
|-id=804 bgcolor=#fefefe
| 240804 ||  || — || December 25, 2005 || Kitt Peak || Spacewatch || — || align=right data-sort-value="0.86" | 860 m || 
|-id=805 bgcolor=#fefefe
| 240805 ||  || — || December 28, 2005 || Mount Lemmon || Mount Lemmon Survey || — || align=right | 1.1 km || 
|-id=806 bgcolor=#fefefe
| 240806 ||  || — || December 25, 2005 || Kitt Peak || Spacewatch || NYS || align=right | 1.1 km || 
|-id=807 bgcolor=#fefefe
| 240807 ||  || — || December 25, 2005 || Mount Lemmon || Mount Lemmon Survey || — || align=right data-sort-value="0.88" | 880 m || 
|-id=808 bgcolor=#fefefe
| 240808 ||  || — || December 25, 2005 || Mount Lemmon || Mount Lemmon Survey || — || align=right data-sort-value="0.99" | 990 m || 
|-id=809 bgcolor=#fefefe
| 240809 ||  || — || December 30, 2005 || Kitt Peak || Spacewatch || FLO || align=right data-sort-value="0.73" | 730 m || 
|-id=810 bgcolor=#fefefe
| 240810 ||  || — || December 26, 2005 || Mount Lemmon || Mount Lemmon Survey || — || align=right | 1.7 km || 
|-id=811 bgcolor=#fefefe
| 240811 ||  || — || December 25, 2005 || Mount Lemmon || Mount Lemmon Survey || — || align=right | 1.2 km || 
|-id=812 bgcolor=#fefefe
| 240812 ||  || — || December 28, 2005 || Mount Lemmon || Mount Lemmon Survey || — || align=right data-sort-value="0.99" | 990 m || 
|-id=813 bgcolor=#fefefe
| 240813 ||  || — || January 3, 2006 || Socorro || LINEAR || — || align=right | 1.1 km || 
|-id=814 bgcolor=#fefefe
| 240814 ||  || — || January 5, 2006 || Kitt Peak || Spacewatch || — || align=right | 2.7 km || 
|-id=815 bgcolor=#fefefe
| 240815 ||  || — || January 5, 2006 || Mount Lemmon || Mount Lemmon Survey || — || align=right data-sort-value="0.85" | 850 m || 
|-id=816 bgcolor=#fefefe
| 240816 ||  || — || January 4, 2006 || Mount Lemmon || Mount Lemmon Survey || — || align=right | 2.2 km || 
|-id=817 bgcolor=#fefefe
| 240817 ||  || — || January 5, 2006 || Kitt Peak || Spacewatch || FLO || align=right data-sort-value="0.80" | 800 m || 
|-id=818 bgcolor=#fefefe
| 240818 ||  || — || January 5, 2006 || Catalina || CSS || NYS || align=right data-sort-value="0.68" | 680 m || 
|-id=819 bgcolor=#fefefe
| 240819 ||  || — || January 5, 2006 || Kitt Peak || Spacewatch || — || align=right data-sort-value="0.83" | 830 m || 
|-id=820 bgcolor=#fefefe
| 240820 ||  || — || January 5, 2006 || Mount Lemmon || Mount Lemmon Survey || — || align=right | 1.0 km || 
|-id=821 bgcolor=#fefefe
| 240821 ||  || — || January 6, 2006 || Kitt Peak || Spacewatch || NYS || align=right data-sort-value="0.72" | 720 m || 
|-id=822 bgcolor=#fefefe
| 240822 ||  || — || January 5, 2006 || Anderson Mesa || LONEOS || NYS || align=right data-sort-value="0.79" | 790 m || 
|-id=823 bgcolor=#fefefe
| 240823 ||  || — || January 7, 2006 || Mount Lemmon || Mount Lemmon Survey || FLO || align=right data-sort-value="0.98" | 980 m || 
|-id=824 bgcolor=#fefefe
| 240824 ||  || — || January 6, 2006 || Mount Lemmon || Mount Lemmon Survey || NYS || align=right data-sort-value="0.93" | 930 m || 
|-id=825 bgcolor=#fefefe
| 240825 ||  || — || January 22, 2006 || Anderson Mesa || LONEOS || NYS || align=right data-sort-value="0.96" | 960 m || 
|-id=826 bgcolor=#fefefe
| 240826 ||  || — || January 22, 2006 || Anderson Mesa || LONEOS || — || align=right | 1.3 km || 
|-id=827 bgcolor=#fefefe
| 240827 ||  || — || January 22, 2006 || Mount Lemmon || Mount Lemmon Survey || — || align=right data-sort-value="0.76" | 760 m || 
|-id=828 bgcolor=#fefefe
| 240828 ||  || — || January 22, 2006 || Mount Lemmon || Mount Lemmon Survey || — || align=right data-sort-value="0.80" | 800 m || 
|-id=829 bgcolor=#fefefe
| 240829 ||  || — || January 23, 2006 || Mount Lemmon || Mount Lemmon Survey || — || align=right | 1.8 km || 
|-id=830 bgcolor=#fefefe
| 240830 ||  || — || January 22, 2006 || Anderson Mesa || LONEOS || — || align=right | 1.5 km || 
|-id=831 bgcolor=#fefefe
| 240831 ||  || — || January 23, 2006 || Kitt Peak || Spacewatch || — || align=right | 1.1 km || 
|-id=832 bgcolor=#fefefe
| 240832 ||  || — || January 23, 2006 || Mount Lemmon || Mount Lemmon Survey || V || align=right data-sort-value="0.77" | 770 m || 
|-id=833 bgcolor=#fefefe
| 240833 ||  || — || January 23, 2006 || Mount Lemmon || Mount Lemmon Survey || MAS || align=right data-sort-value="0.87" | 870 m || 
|-id=834 bgcolor=#fefefe
| 240834 ||  || — || January 23, 2006 || Kitt Peak || Spacewatch || — || align=right data-sort-value="0.97" | 970 m || 
|-id=835 bgcolor=#fefefe
| 240835 ||  || — || January 23, 2006 || Kitt Peak || Spacewatch || NYS || align=right data-sort-value="0.70" | 700 m || 
|-id=836 bgcolor=#fefefe
| 240836 ||  || — || January 23, 2006 || Kitt Peak || Spacewatch || — || align=right | 1.3 km || 
|-id=837 bgcolor=#fefefe
| 240837 ||  || — || January 23, 2006 || Kitt Peak || Spacewatch || — || align=right | 1.2 km || 
|-id=838 bgcolor=#fefefe
| 240838 ||  || — || January 23, 2006 || Kitt Peak || Spacewatch || V || align=right | 1.1 km || 
|-id=839 bgcolor=#fefefe
| 240839 ||  || — || January 23, 2006 || Kitt Peak || Spacewatch || — || align=right | 1.1 km || 
|-id=840 bgcolor=#fefefe
| 240840 ||  || — || January 25, 2006 || Catalina || CSS || MAS || align=right data-sort-value="0.85" | 850 m || 
|-id=841 bgcolor=#fefefe
| 240841 ||  || — || January 26, 2006 || Kitt Peak || Spacewatch || MAS || align=right data-sort-value="0.89" | 890 m || 
|-id=842 bgcolor=#fefefe
| 240842 ||  || — || January 26, 2006 || Kitt Peak || Spacewatch || MAS || align=right data-sort-value="0.87" | 870 m || 
|-id=843 bgcolor=#fefefe
| 240843 ||  || — || January 26, 2006 || Kitt Peak || Spacewatch || MAS || align=right data-sort-value="0.97" | 970 m || 
|-id=844 bgcolor=#fefefe
| 240844 ||  || — || January 26, 2006 || Kitt Peak || Spacewatch || NYS || align=right data-sort-value="0.77" | 770 m || 
|-id=845 bgcolor=#fefefe
| 240845 ||  || — || January 26, 2006 || Kitt Peak || Spacewatch || MAS || align=right data-sort-value="0.69" | 690 m || 
|-id=846 bgcolor=#fefefe
| 240846 ||  || — || January 26, 2006 || Kitt Peak || Spacewatch || FLO || align=right data-sort-value="0.97" | 970 m || 
|-id=847 bgcolor=#fefefe
| 240847 ||  || — || January 28, 2006 || Mount Lemmon || Mount Lemmon Survey || V || align=right data-sort-value="0.95" | 950 m || 
|-id=848 bgcolor=#fefefe
| 240848 ||  || — || January 29, 2006 || Kitt Peak || Spacewatch || MAS || align=right data-sort-value="0.93" | 930 m || 
|-id=849 bgcolor=#fefefe
| 240849 ||  || — || January 31, 2006 || 7300 Observatory || W. K. Y. Yeung || NYS || align=right data-sort-value="0.66" | 660 m || 
|-id=850 bgcolor=#fefefe
| 240850 ||  || — || January 25, 2006 || Kitt Peak || Spacewatch || — || align=right | 1.00 km || 
|-id=851 bgcolor=#fefefe
| 240851 ||  || — || January 25, 2006 || Kitt Peak || Spacewatch || NYS || align=right | 1.1 km || 
|-id=852 bgcolor=#fefefe
| 240852 ||  || — || January 25, 2006 || Kitt Peak || Spacewatch || NYS || align=right data-sort-value="0.69" | 690 m || 
|-id=853 bgcolor=#fefefe
| 240853 ||  || — || January 25, 2006 || Kitt Peak || Spacewatch || V || align=right data-sort-value="0.80" | 800 m || 
|-id=854 bgcolor=#fefefe
| 240854 ||  || — || January 26, 2006 || Mount Lemmon || Mount Lemmon Survey || — || align=right | 1.1 km || 
|-id=855 bgcolor=#fefefe
| 240855 ||  || — || January 28, 2006 || Mount Lemmon || Mount Lemmon Survey || FLO || align=right data-sort-value="0.71" | 710 m || 
|-id=856 bgcolor=#fefefe
| 240856 ||  || — || January 28, 2006 || Kitt Peak || Spacewatch || — || align=right | 1.2 km || 
|-id=857 bgcolor=#fefefe
| 240857 ||  || — || January 30, 2006 || Kitt Peak || Spacewatch || — || align=right | 1.2 km || 
|-id=858 bgcolor=#fefefe
| 240858 ||  || — || January 30, 2006 || Kitt Peak || Spacewatch || V || align=right data-sort-value="0.76" | 760 m || 
|-id=859 bgcolor=#fefefe
| 240859 ||  || — || January 31, 2006 || Kitt Peak || Spacewatch || — || align=right data-sort-value="0.73" | 730 m || 
|-id=860 bgcolor=#fefefe
| 240860 ||  || — || January 27, 2006 || Anderson Mesa || LONEOS || — || align=right | 1.2 km || 
|-id=861 bgcolor=#fefefe
| 240861 ||  || — || January 30, 2006 || Kitt Peak || Spacewatch || MAS || align=right | 1.0 km || 
|-id=862 bgcolor=#fefefe
| 240862 ||  || — || January 27, 2006 || Catalina || CSS || — || align=right | 1.4 km || 
|-id=863 bgcolor=#fefefe
| 240863 ||  || — || February 1, 2006 || Jarnac || Jarnac Obs. || — || align=right | 1.3 km || 
|-id=864 bgcolor=#fefefe
| 240864 ||  || — || February 1, 2006 || Kitt Peak || Spacewatch || — || align=right | 1.0 km || 
|-id=865 bgcolor=#fefefe
| 240865 ||  || — || February 1, 2006 || Kitt Peak || Spacewatch || MAS || align=right data-sort-value="0.91" | 910 m || 
|-id=866 bgcolor=#fefefe
| 240866 ||  || — || February 1, 2006 || Kitt Peak || Spacewatch || V || align=right | 1.0 km || 
|-id=867 bgcolor=#fefefe
| 240867 ||  || — || February 2, 2006 || Mount Lemmon || Mount Lemmon Survey || MAS || align=right data-sort-value="0.96" | 960 m || 
|-id=868 bgcolor=#fefefe
| 240868 ||  || — || February 3, 2006 || Kitt Peak || Spacewatch || — || align=right data-sort-value="0.92" | 920 m || 
|-id=869 bgcolor=#fefefe
| 240869 ||  || — || February 3, 2006 || Kitt Peak || Spacewatch || — || align=right data-sort-value="0.97" | 970 m || 
|-id=870 bgcolor=#fefefe
| 240870 ||  || — || February 3, 2006 || Mount Lemmon || Mount Lemmon Survey || MAS || align=right data-sort-value="0.87" | 870 m || 
|-id=871 bgcolor=#FA8072
| 240871 MOSS || 2006 DA ||  || February 19, 2006 || Vicques || M. Ory || — || align=right | 1.4 km || 
|-id=872 bgcolor=#fefefe
| 240872 ||  || — || February 20, 2006 || Catalina || CSS || NYS || align=right | 2.1 km || 
|-id=873 bgcolor=#fefefe
| 240873 ||  || — || February 20, 2006 || Catalina || CSS || FLO || align=right data-sort-value="0.79" | 790 m || 
|-id=874 bgcolor=#fefefe
| 240874 ||  || — || February 20, 2006 || Mount Lemmon || Mount Lemmon Survey || NYS || align=right | 1.9 km || 
|-id=875 bgcolor=#fefefe
| 240875 ||  || — || February 22, 2006 || Socorro || LINEAR || NYS || align=right | 1.9 km || 
|-id=876 bgcolor=#fefefe
| 240876 ||  || — || February 20, 2006 || Kitt Peak || Spacewatch || MAS || align=right data-sort-value="0.70" | 700 m || 
|-id=877 bgcolor=#fefefe
| 240877 ||  || — || February 20, 2006 || Kitt Peak || Spacewatch || NYS || align=right data-sort-value="0.77" | 770 m || 
|-id=878 bgcolor=#fefefe
| 240878 ||  || — || February 20, 2006 || Mount Lemmon || Mount Lemmon Survey || FLO || align=right | 1.7 km || 
|-id=879 bgcolor=#fefefe
| 240879 ||  || — || February 20, 2006 || Kitt Peak || Spacewatch || FLO || align=right data-sort-value="0.83" | 830 m || 
|-id=880 bgcolor=#fefefe
| 240880 ||  || — || February 20, 2006 || Kitt Peak || Spacewatch || — || align=right data-sort-value="0.92" | 920 m || 
|-id=881 bgcolor=#fefefe
| 240881 ||  || — || February 22, 2006 || Catalina || CSS || V || align=right | 1.00 km || 
|-id=882 bgcolor=#fefefe
| 240882 ||  || — || February 20, 2006 || Mount Lemmon || Mount Lemmon Survey || — || align=right | 1.1 km || 
|-id=883 bgcolor=#fefefe
| 240883 ||  || — || February 21, 2006 || Catalina || CSS || MAS || align=right | 1.00 km || 
|-id=884 bgcolor=#fefefe
| 240884 ||  || — || February 24, 2006 || Kitt Peak || Spacewatch || NYS || align=right data-sort-value="0.98" | 980 m || 
|-id=885 bgcolor=#fefefe
| 240885 ||  || — || February 24, 2006 || Kitt Peak || Spacewatch || — || align=right | 1.2 km || 
|-id=886 bgcolor=#E9E9E9
| 240886 ||  || — || February 24, 2006 || Kitt Peak || Spacewatch || — || align=right | 1.5 km || 
|-id=887 bgcolor=#E9E9E9
| 240887 ||  || — || February 23, 2006 || Anderson Mesa || LONEOS || — || align=right | 2.6 km || 
|-id=888 bgcolor=#fefefe
| 240888 ||  || — || February 24, 2006 || Pla D'Arguines || Pla D'Arguines Obs. || V || align=right data-sort-value="0.71" | 710 m || 
|-id=889 bgcolor=#fefefe
| 240889 ||  || — || February 20, 2006 || Socorro || LINEAR || V || align=right | 1.1 km || 
|-id=890 bgcolor=#fefefe
| 240890 ||  || — || February 20, 2006 || Kitt Peak || Spacewatch || — || align=right data-sort-value="0.80" | 800 m || 
|-id=891 bgcolor=#fefefe
| 240891 ||  || — || February 20, 2006 || Mount Lemmon || Mount Lemmon Survey || — || align=right data-sort-value="0.77" | 770 m || 
|-id=892 bgcolor=#E9E9E9
| 240892 ||  || — || February 20, 2006 || Mount Lemmon || Mount Lemmon Survey || — || align=right | 2.9 km || 
|-id=893 bgcolor=#fefefe
| 240893 ||  || — || February 21, 2006 || Mount Lemmon || Mount Lemmon Survey || — || align=right data-sort-value="0.90" | 900 m || 
|-id=894 bgcolor=#fefefe
| 240894 ||  || — || February 23, 2006 || Anderson Mesa || LONEOS || V || align=right | 1.1 km || 
|-id=895 bgcolor=#fefefe
| 240895 ||  || — || February 24, 2006 || Kitt Peak || Spacewatch || MAS || align=right | 1.2 km || 
|-id=896 bgcolor=#fefefe
| 240896 ||  || — || February 24, 2006 || Kitt Peak || Spacewatch || KLI || align=right | 2.5 km || 
|-id=897 bgcolor=#fefefe
| 240897 ||  || — || February 24, 2006 || Kitt Peak || Spacewatch || MAS || align=right data-sort-value="0.98" | 980 m || 
|-id=898 bgcolor=#fefefe
| 240898 ||  || — || February 24, 2006 || Kitt Peak || Spacewatch || NYS || align=right data-sort-value="0.73" | 730 m || 
|-id=899 bgcolor=#E9E9E9
| 240899 ||  || — || February 24, 2006 || Mount Lemmon || Mount Lemmon Survey || BAR || align=right | 1.7 km || 
|-id=900 bgcolor=#E9E9E9
| 240900 ||  || — || February 24, 2006 || Kitt Peak || Spacewatch || — || align=right | 1.9 km || 
|}

240901–241000 

|-bgcolor=#fefefe
| 240901 ||  || — || February 25, 2006 || Kitt Peak || Spacewatch || ERI || align=right | 2.3 km || 
|-id=902 bgcolor=#fefefe
| 240902 ||  || — || February 25, 2006 || Mount Lemmon || Mount Lemmon Survey || NYS || align=right | 1.3 km || 
|-id=903 bgcolor=#fefefe
| 240903 ||  || — || February 27, 2006 || Kitt Peak || Spacewatch || MAS || align=right | 1.1 km || 
|-id=904 bgcolor=#fefefe
| 240904 ||  || — || February 25, 2006 || Kitt Peak || Spacewatch || FLO || align=right data-sort-value="0.76" | 760 m || 
|-id=905 bgcolor=#fefefe
| 240905 ||  || — || February 25, 2006 || Kitt Peak || Spacewatch || NYS || align=right data-sort-value="0.74" | 740 m || 
|-id=906 bgcolor=#fefefe
| 240906 ||  || — || February 25, 2006 || Kitt Peak || Spacewatch || — || align=right | 1.0 km || 
|-id=907 bgcolor=#fefefe
| 240907 ||  || — || February 25, 2006 || Kitt Peak || Spacewatch || ERI || align=right | 2.2 km || 
|-id=908 bgcolor=#fefefe
| 240908 ||  || — || February 25, 2006 || Kitt Peak || Spacewatch || NYS || align=right data-sort-value="0.77" | 770 m || 
|-id=909 bgcolor=#E9E9E9
| 240909 ||  || — || February 27, 2006 || Kitt Peak || Spacewatch || — || align=right | 2.8 km || 
|-id=910 bgcolor=#fefefe
| 240910 ||  || — || February 27, 2006 || Kitt Peak || Spacewatch || NYS || align=right data-sort-value="0.89" | 890 m || 
|-id=911 bgcolor=#fefefe
| 240911 ||  || — || February 27, 2006 || Kitt Peak || Spacewatch || NYS || align=right | 1.00 km || 
|-id=912 bgcolor=#fefefe
| 240912 ||  || — || February 27, 2006 || Kitt Peak || Spacewatch || NYS || align=right data-sort-value="0.98" | 980 m || 
|-id=913 bgcolor=#fefefe
| 240913 ||  || — || February 27, 2006 || Kitt Peak || Spacewatch || ERI || align=right | 2.8 km || 
|-id=914 bgcolor=#C2FFFF
| 240914 ||  || — || February 24, 2006 || Kitt Peak || Spacewatch || L5 || align=right | 14 km || 
|-id=915 bgcolor=#fefefe
| 240915 ||  || — || February 24, 2006 || Kitt Peak || Spacewatch || NYS || align=right data-sort-value="0.72" | 720 m || 
|-id=916 bgcolor=#fefefe
| 240916 ||  || — || February 24, 2006 || Kitt Peak || Spacewatch || V || align=right | 1.1 km || 
|-id=917 bgcolor=#fefefe
| 240917 ||  || — || March 4, 2006 || Goodricke-Pigott || R. A. Tucker || — || align=right | 1.8 km || 
|-id=918 bgcolor=#fefefe
| 240918 ||  || — || March 2, 2006 || Kitt Peak || Spacewatch || MAS || align=right data-sort-value="0.78" | 780 m || 
|-id=919 bgcolor=#E9E9E9
| 240919 ||  || — || March 4, 2006 || Kitt Peak || Spacewatch || — || align=right | 2.4 km || 
|-id=920 bgcolor=#fefefe
| 240920 ||  || — || March 5, 2006 || Kitt Peak || Spacewatch || V || align=right data-sort-value="0.91" | 910 m || 
|-id=921 bgcolor=#fefefe
| 240921 ||  || — || March 8, 2006 || Kitt Peak || Spacewatch || V || align=right data-sort-value="0.87" | 870 m || 
|-id=922 bgcolor=#E9E9E9
| 240922 ||  || — || March 23, 2006 || Kitt Peak || Spacewatch || — || align=right | 2.5 km || 
|-id=923 bgcolor=#E9E9E9
| 240923 ||  || — || March 23, 2006 || Kitt Peak || Spacewatch || — || align=right | 1.4 km || 
|-id=924 bgcolor=#fefefe
| 240924 ||  || — || March 23, 2006 || Mount Lemmon || Mount Lemmon Survey || — || align=right data-sort-value="0.96" | 960 m || 
|-id=925 bgcolor=#E9E9E9
| 240925 ||  || — || March 23, 2006 || Mount Lemmon || Mount Lemmon Survey || ADE || align=right | 2.8 km || 
|-id=926 bgcolor=#E9E9E9
| 240926 ||  || — || March 23, 2006 || Catalina || CSS || — || align=right | 2.0 km || 
|-id=927 bgcolor=#fefefe
| 240927 ||  || — || March 26, 2006 || Reedy Creek || J. Broughton || — || align=right | 2.7 km || 
|-id=928 bgcolor=#E9E9E9
| 240928 ||  || — || March 23, 2006 || Mount Lemmon || Mount Lemmon Survey || — || align=right | 1.0 km || 
|-id=929 bgcolor=#fefefe
| 240929 ||  || — || March 23, 2006 || Mount Lemmon || Mount Lemmon Survey || — || align=right | 1.0 km || 
|-id=930 bgcolor=#fefefe
| 240930 ||  || — || March 24, 2006 || Mount Lemmon || Mount Lemmon Survey || ERI || align=right | 3.2 km || 
|-id=931 bgcolor=#E9E9E9
| 240931 ||  || — || March 24, 2006 || Mount Lemmon || Mount Lemmon Survey || — || align=right | 3.2 km || 
|-id=932 bgcolor=#fefefe
| 240932 ||  || — || March 25, 2006 || Mount Lemmon || Mount Lemmon Survey || FLO || align=right data-sort-value="0.85" | 850 m || 
|-id=933 bgcolor=#E9E9E9
| 240933 ||  || — || March 25, 2006 || Kitt Peak || Spacewatch || — || align=right data-sort-value="0.96" | 960 m || 
|-id=934 bgcolor=#E9E9E9
| 240934 ||  || — || March 26, 2006 || Mount Lemmon || Mount Lemmon Survey || — || align=right | 3.1 km || 
|-id=935 bgcolor=#fefefe
| 240935 ||  || — || March 26, 2006 || Anderson Mesa || LONEOS || — || align=right | 1.2 km || 
|-id=936 bgcolor=#E9E9E9
| 240936 ||  || — || March 26, 2006 || Siding Spring || SSS || — || align=right | 2.7 km || 
|-id=937 bgcolor=#E9E9E9
| 240937 ||  || — || April 2, 2006 || Great Shefford || P. Birtwhistle || — || align=right | 2.1 km || 
|-id=938 bgcolor=#fefefe
| 240938 ||  || — || April 2, 2006 || Kitt Peak || Spacewatch || — || align=right | 1.3 km || 
|-id=939 bgcolor=#fefefe
| 240939 ||  || — || April 2, 2006 || Kitt Peak || Spacewatch || — || align=right | 1.2 km || 
|-id=940 bgcolor=#E9E9E9
| 240940 ||  || — || April 2, 2006 || Mount Lemmon || Mount Lemmon Survey || — || align=right | 2.7 km || 
|-id=941 bgcolor=#E9E9E9
| 240941 ||  || — || April 2, 2006 || Kitt Peak || Spacewatch || — || align=right | 1.4 km || 
|-id=942 bgcolor=#E9E9E9
| 240942 ||  || — || April 2, 2006 || Kitt Peak || Spacewatch || — || align=right | 1.3 km || 
|-id=943 bgcolor=#fefefe
| 240943 ||  || — || April 7, 2006 || Kitt Peak || Spacewatch || NYS || align=right | 1.1 km || 
|-id=944 bgcolor=#fefefe
| 240944 ||  || — || April 7, 2006 || Anderson Mesa || LONEOS || — || align=right | 1.4 km || 
|-id=945 bgcolor=#E9E9E9
| 240945 ||  || — || April 8, 2006 || Kitt Peak || Spacewatch || — || align=right | 1.5 km || 
|-id=946 bgcolor=#E9E9E9
| 240946 ||  || — || April 8, 2006 || Catalina || CSS || — || align=right | 3.5 km || 
|-id=947 bgcolor=#E9E9E9
| 240947 ||  || — || April 12, 2006 || Palomar || NEAT || INO || align=right | 1.5 km || 
|-id=948 bgcolor=#E9E9E9
| 240948 ||  || — || April 7, 2006 || Kitt Peak || Spacewatch || — || align=right | 1.5 km || 
|-id=949 bgcolor=#E9E9E9
| 240949 ||  || — || April 8, 2006 || Kitt Peak || Spacewatch || — || align=right | 1.2 km || 
|-id=950 bgcolor=#E9E9E9
| 240950 ||  || — || April 19, 2006 || Kitt Peak || Spacewatch || — || align=right | 1.9 km || 
|-id=951 bgcolor=#fefefe
| 240951 ||  || — || April 18, 2006 || Kitt Peak || Spacewatch || — || align=right | 1.2 km || 
|-id=952 bgcolor=#E9E9E9
| 240952 ||  || — || April 20, 2006 || Kitt Peak || Spacewatch || — || align=right | 1.6 km || 
|-id=953 bgcolor=#E9E9E9
| 240953 ||  || — || April 19, 2006 || Mount Lemmon || Mount Lemmon Survey || — || align=right | 1.3 km || 
|-id=954 bgcolor=#E9E9E9
| 240954 ||  || — || April 24, 2006 || Mount Lemmon || Mount Lemmon Survey || — || align=right | 1.1 km || 
|-id=955 bgcolor=#E9E9E9
| 240955 ||  || — || April 24, 2006 || Mount Lemmon || Mount Lemmon Survey || — || align=right | 3.1 km || 
|-id=956 bgcolor=#E9E9E9
| 240956 ||  || — || April 20, 2006 || Kitt Peak || Spacewatch || — || align=right | 1.3 km || 
|-id=957 bgcolor=#E9E9E9
| 240957 ||  || — || April 21, 2006 || Catalina || CSS || KRM || align=right | 3.7 km || 
|-id=958 bgcolor=#E9E9E9
| 240958 ||  || — || April 21, 2006 || Catalina || CSS || — || align=right | 1.4 km || 
|-id=959 bgcolor=#E9E9E9
| 240959 ||  || — || April 24, 2006 || Kitt Peak || Spacewatch || — || align=right | 1.7 km || 
|-id=960 bgcolor=#E9E9E9
| 240960 ||  || — || April 24, 2006 || Mount Lemmon || Mount Lemmon Survey || — || align=right | 2.0 km || 
|-id=961 bgcolor=#E9E9E9
| 240961 ||  || — || April 26, 2006 || Kitt Peak || Spacewatch || — || align=right | 1.1 km || 
|-id=962 bgcolor=#E9E9E9
| 240962 ||  || — || April 26, 2006 || Kitt Peak || Spacewatch || — || align=right | 1.7 km || 
|-id=963 bgcolor=#E9E9E9
| 240963 ||  || — || April 26, 2006 || Siding Spring || SSS || RAF || align=right | 1.4 km || 
|-id=964 bgcolor=#E9E9E9
| 240964 ||  || — || April 30, 2006 || Kitt Peak || Spacewatch || — || align=right | 2.5 km || 
|-id=965 bgcolor=#E9E9E9
| 240965 ||  || — || April 25, 2006 || Mount Lemmon || Mount Lemmon Survey || — || align=right | 1.2 km || 
|-id=966 bgcolor=#E9E9E9
| 240966 ||  || — || April 25, 2006 || Mount Lemmon || Mount Lemmon Survey || — || align=right | 2.3 km || 
|-id=967 bgcolor=#E9E9E9
| 240967 ||  || — || May 1, 2006 || Kitt Peak || Spacewatch || — || align=right | 2.4 km || 
|-id=968 bgcolor=#E9E9E9
| 240968 ||  || — || May 2, 2006 || Mount Lemmon || Mount Lemmon Survey || — || align=right data-sort-value="0.86" | 860 m || 
|-id=969 bgcolor=#E9E9E9
| 240969 ||  || — || May 1, 2006 || Kitt Peak || Spacewatch || — || align=right | 4.0 km || 
|-id=970 bgcolor=#E9E9E9
| 240970 ||  || — || May 1, 2006 || Kitt Peak || Spacewatch || — || align=right | 1.9 km || 
|-id=971 bgcolor=#E9E9E9
| 240971 ||  || — || May 2, 2006 || Mount Lemmon || Mount Lemmon Survey || — || align=right | 1.1 km || 
|-id=972 bgcolor=#E9E9E9
| 240972 ||  || — || May 4, 2006 || Reedy Creek || J. Broughton || RAF || align=right | 1.5 km || 
|-id=973 bgcolor=#E9E9E9
| 240973 ||  || — || May 3, 2006 || Kitt Peak || Spacewatch || — || align=right | 1.1 km || 
|-id=974 bgcolor=#E9E9E9
| 240974 ||  || — || May 3, 2006 || Mount Lemmon || Mount Lemmon Survey || — || align=right | 1.1 km || 
|-id=975 bgcolor=#fefefe
| 240975 ||  || — || May 5, 2006 || Kitt Peak || Spacewatch || V || align=right data-sort-value="0.89" | 890 m || 
|-id=976 bgcolor=#E9E9E9
| 240976 ||  || — || May 7, 2006 || Mount Lemmon || Mount Lemmon Survey || — || align=right | 1.2 km || 
|-id=977 bgcolor=#E9E9E9
| 240977 ||  || — || May 2, 2006 || Kitt Peak || Spacewatch || — || align=right | 1.3 km || 
|-id=978 bgcolor=#E9E9E9
| 240978 ||  || — || May 7, 2006 || Mount Lemmon || Mount Lemmon Survey || — || align=right | 1.7 km || 
|-id=979 bgcolor=#E9E9E9
| 240979 ||  || — || May 8, 2006 || Siding Spring || SSS || — || align=right | 3.6 km || 
|-id=980 bgcolor=#E9E9E9
| 240980 ||  || — || May 9, 2006 || Mount Lemmon || Mount Lemmon Survey || — || align=right | 1.3 km || 
|-id=981 bgcolor=#E9E9E9
| 240981 ||  || — || May 4, 2006 || Siding Spring || SSS || EUN || align=right | 1.9 km || 
|-id=982 bgcolor=#E9E9E9
| 240982 ||  || — || May 6, 2006 || Mount Lemmon || Mount Lemmon Survey || ADE || align=right | 4.0 km || 
|-id=983 bgcolor=#E9E9E9
| 240983 ||  || — || May 20, 2006 || Reedy Creek || J. Broughton || EUN || align=right | 2.1 km || 
|-id=984 bgcolor=#E9E9E9
| 240984 ||  || — || May 19, 2006 || Mount Lemmon || Mount Lemmon Survey || — || align=right | 1.1 km || 
|-id=985 bgcolor=#d6d6d6
| 240985 ||  || — || May 19, 2006 || Mount Lemmon || Mount Lemmon Survey || TIR || align=right | 4.0 km || 
|-id=986 bgcolor=#E9E9E9
| 240986 ||  || — || May 19, 2006 || Mount Lemmon || Mount Lemmon Survey || GER || align=right | 2.1 km || 
|-id=987 bgcolor=#E9E9E9
| 240987 ||  || — || May 19, 2006 || Catalina || CSS || — || align=right | 3.1 km || 
|-id=988 bgcolor=#E9E9E9
| 240988 ||  || — || May 19, 2006 || Palomar || NEAT || — || align=right | 1.6 km || 
|-id=989 bgcolor=#E9E9E9
| 240989 ||  || — || May 21, 2006 || Kitt Peak || Spacewatch || — || align=right | 1.3 km || 
|-id=990 bgcolor=#E9E9E9
| 240990 ||  || — || May 21, 2006 || Kitt Peak || Spacewatch || — || align=right | 1.2 km || 
|-id=991 bgcolor=#E9E9E9
| 240991 ||  || — || May 21, 2006 || Kitt Peak || Spacewatch || EUN || align=right | 1.4 km || 
|-id=992 bgcolor=#E9E9E9
| 240992 ||  || — || May 21, 2006 || Kitt Peak || Spacewatch || — || align=right | 1.2 km || 
|-id=993 bgcolor=#E9E9E9
| 240993 ||  || — || May 22, 2006 || Kitt Peak || Spacewatch || PAD || align=right | 3.3 km || 
|-id=994 bgcolor=#E9E9E9
| 240994 ||  || — || May 22, 2006 || Kitt Peak || Spacewatch || — || align=right | 1.2 km || 
|-id=995 bgcolor=#E9E9E9
| 240995 ||  || — || May 22, 2006 || Kitt Peak || Spacewatch || KON || align=right | 2.2 km || 
|-id=996 bgcolor=#E9E9E9
| 240996 ||  || — || May 22, 2006 || Kitt Peak || Spacewatch || — || align=right | 3.0 km || 
|-id=997 bgcolor=#E9E9E9
| 240997 ||  || — || May 24, 2006 || Kitt Peak || Spacewatch || — || align=right | 1.4 km || 
|-id=998 bgcolor=#E9E9E9
| 240998 ||  || — || May 24, 2006 || Mount Lemmon || Mount Lemmon Survey || — || align=right | 3.1 km || 
|-id=999 bgcolor=#E9E9E9
| 240999 ||  || — || May 20, 2006 || Catalina || CSS || — || align=right | 1.3 km || 
|-id=000 bgcolor=#E9E9E9
| 241000 ||  || — || May 22, 2006 || Siding Spring || SSS || — || align=right | 2.4 km || 
|}

References

External links 
 Discovery Circumstances: Numbered Minor Planets (240001)–(245000) (IAU Minor Planet Center)

0240